= List of universities and colleges in Tanzania =

Location of Tanzania

In the East African country of Tanzania, institutions of higher education (universities and university colleges) are regulated by the Government of Tanzania's Tanzania Commission for Universities. Without its approval, a college or university may not legally operate within the country. This organization, its review process, and its set of regulatory guidelines, was established with the July 1, 2005 enactment of Tanzania's "Universities Act, Cap. 346".

In 2020, Tanzania had 43 universities. By February 2024, the number of approved university institutions operating in Tanzania grew to 49; of these, there were 19 public-owned, and 30 privately-owned.

As of March 2026, there are 52 approved university institutions legally permitted to operate in Tanzania; of these, 20 are public-owned and 32 are privately owned.

== Public universities ==
Reg. No.	Institution	Acronym	Founded	University status	Former name(s)	Region
001	University of Dar es Salaam	UDSM	1961	1970	University College, Dar es Salaam	Dar es Salaam
002	University of Dodoma	UDOM	2007	2007	-	Dodoma
003	The Open University of Tanzania	OUT	1992	1992	–	Dar es Salaam
004	Institute of Accountancy Arusha	IAA	-	-	-	Arusha
004	Ardhi University	AU	1956	2007	Ardhi Institute and UCLAS	Dar es Salaam
010	State University of Zanzibar	SUZA	1999	1999	–	Zanzibar Urban
011	Mzumbe University	MU	1975	2001	Institute of Development Management	Morogoro
014	Sokoine University of Agriculture	SUA	1984	-		Morogoro
015	Muhimbili University of Health and Allied Sciences	MUHAS	1963	2007	Dar es Salaam School of Medicine and MUCHS	Dar es Salaam
016	Nelson Mandela African Institute of Science and Technology	NM–AIST	2009	2010	–	Arusha
025	Katavi University of Agriculture	KUA			–	Katavi
026	Mbeya University of Science and Technology	MUST	1986	2012/13	Mbeya Technical College and MIST	Mbeya
028	Moshi Co-operative University	MoCU	1963	2014	Moshi university college of cooperative and business studies(MUCCOBS)	Kilimanjaro
	IIT Madras Zanzibar		2023			Zanzibar

== Private universities ==
Reg. No.	Institution	Acronym	Founded	Affiliation	Former name(s)	Region
005	Hubert Kairuki Memorial University	HKMU	1997	KHEN	Mikocheni International University	Dar es Salaam
006	International Medical and Technological University	IMTU	1997	VEF	–	Dar es Salaam
007	Tumaini University Makumira	TUMA	1997	Lutheran	Lutheran Theological College Makumira	Arusha
008	St. Augustine University of Tanzania	SAUT	2002	Catholic	Nyegezi Social Training Institute	Mwanza
009	Zanzibar University	ZU	2002	Islamic	–	Zanzibar Urban
012	Mount Meru University	MMU	2005	Baptist	International Baptist Theological Seminary of Eastern Africa	Arusha
013	University of Arusha	UoA	2006	Seventh-day Adventist	Tanzania Adventist College	Arusha
014	Teofilo Kisanji University	TEKU	2007	Moravian	–	Mbeya
017	Muslim University of Morogoro	MUM	2004	Islamic	–	Morogoro
018	St. John's University of Tanzania	SJUT	2007	Anglican	–	Dodoma
020	University of Bagamoyo	UB	2010	TANLET and LHRC	–	Dar es Salaam
021	Eckernforde Tanga University	ETU	2010		–	Tanga
022	Catholic University of Health and Allied Sciences	CUHAS	1994	Catholic	–	Mwanza
023	St. Joseph University In Tanzania	SJUIT	2011	Catholic	–	Dar es Salaam
024	United African University of Tanzania	UAUT	2012	Korea Church Mission	–	Dar es Salaam
027	Sebastian Kolowa Memorial University	SEKOMU	2012	Lutheran	Sebastian Kolowa University College	Tanga
028	Tanzania International University	TIU			–	Dar es Salaam
030	University of Iringa	UoI	1994	Lutheran	Tumaini University	Iringa

== Public university colleges ==
Reg. No.	Institution	Acronym	Founded	Region
001	University College of Education Zanzibar	UCEZ	1999	Zanzibar Urban
002	Dar es Salaam University College of Education	DUCE	2005	Dar es Salaam
003	Moshi University College of Cooperative and Business Studies	MUCCOBS	2003	Kilimanjaro
004	Mkwawa University College of Education	MUCE	2003	Iringa
005	Mwalimu Nyerere Memorial Academy	MNMA	1961/2005	Dar es Salaam

== Private university colleges ==
Reg. No.	Institution	Acronym	Founded	Region
005	Kampala International University Dar es Salaam College	KIU-DAR	2008	Dar es Salaam
006	Mwenge University College of Education	MWUCE	2003	Kilimanjaro
007	Kilimanjaro Christian Medical College	KCMCo	2003	Kilimanjaro
008	Ruaha Catholic University	RUCU	2006	Iringa
009	St. Francis University College of Health and Allied Sciences	SFUCHAS	2010	Morogoro
010	St. Joseph University College of Agricultural Sciences and Technology	SJUCAST	2000	Ruvuma
011	St. Joseph University College of Information and Technology	SJUCIT	2000	Ruvuma
012	St. Joseph University College of Management and Commerce	SJUCMC	2000	Njombe
013	Stefano Moshi Memorial University College	SMMUCO	2002	Kilimanjaro
016	Stella Maris Mtwara University College	STEMMUCO	2009	Mtwara
015	Tumaini University Dar es Salaam College	TUDARCO	2005	Dar es Salaam
018	Canada Education Support Network	CESUNE COLLEGE	2015	Dar es salaam
039	Al-Maktoum College of Engineering and Technology	AMCET	2010	Dar es Salaam

== See also ==
- Tanzania Commission for Universities
- List of Tanzanian university chancellors and vice-chancellors
- Education in Africa
