= List of Tanzanian university chancellors and vice-chancellors =

Location of Tanzania

The following is a list of Tanzanian university chancellors and vice-chancellors. The Chancellor is the ceremonial head, while the Vice-Chancellor is chief academic officer and chief executive.

	University	Chancellor	Vice-Chancellor
1	Ardhi University	Cleopa Msuya	Prof. Idrissa Mshoro
2	University of Arusha		Dr. Emmanuel Matiku
3	University of Bagamoyo	Elinaza Sendoro	Prof. Costa Mahalu
4	Catholic University of Health and Allied Sciences	Rt. Rev. Jude Ruwa’ichi	Prof. Jacob Mtabaji
5	University of Dar es Salaam	Jakaya Mrisho Kikwete	Prof. William Anangisye
6	University of Dodoma	Stergomena Lawrence Tax	Prof. Faustine Karrani Bee
7	Eckernforde Tanga University		
8	Hubert Kairuki Memorial University	Anne Semamba Makinda	Prof. Yohana J.S Mashalla
9	International Medical and Technological University	Andy Chande	Prof. Joseph Shija
10	Mbeya University of Science and Technology	Prof Mark Mwandosya	Prof. Joseph Msambichaka
11	Mount Meru University		
12	Muhimbili University of Health and Allied Sciences	Ali Hassan Mwinyi	Prof. Andreas pembe
13	Muslim University of Morogoro	Hajjat Mwatumu Malale	Prof. Hamza Njozi
14	Mzumbe University	Barnabas Samatta	Prof. Joseph Kuzilwa
15	Nelson Mandela African Institute of Science and Technology	Mohamed Gharib Bilal	Prof. Emmanuel J. Luoga
16	The Open University of Tanzania	Mizengo Pinda	Prof. Elifas Bisanda
17	Sebastian Kolowa Memorial University	Rt. Rev. Dr. Stephen Munga	Prof. Vincent Kihiyo
18	Sokoine University of Agriculture	Joseph Warioba	Prof. R. Chibunda
19	St. Augustine University of Tanzania	His Grace Gervas Nyaisonga	Prof. Costa Mahalu
20	St. John's University of Tanzania	Bishop Donald Mtetemela	Prof. Gabriel Mwaluko
21	St. Joseph University In Tanzania	Rev. Fr. J. E. Arulraj	Prof. Eliab Z. Opiyo
22	State University of Zanzibar	Ali Mohamed Shein	Prof. Idris Rai
23	Teofilo Kisanji University	Bishop Alinikisa Cheyo	Prof. Tuli Kassimoto
24	Tumaini University Makumira	Rt. Rev. Dr. Frederick Shoo	Rev. Prof. Dr. Joseph Parsalaw
25	United African University of Tanzania	Won, Dong Yeon	Prof. Ho Chan Hwang
26	Zanzibar University		Prof. Mustafa Roshash

== See also ==
- List of university leaders
- List of universities in Tanzania

St. John's University of Tanzania, Vice Chancellor: Prof. Yohana Msanjila
