= List of law schools in Tanzania =

The following are the law schools in Tanzania.

S/N	Name of Institution	Ownership	Division	Location	Campus
01	University of Dar es Salaam	Public	School of Law	Dar es Salaam	Mwalimu Julius Kambarage Nyerere Main Campus.
02	Mzumbe University	Public	Faculty of Law	Morogoro; Mbeya	Mzumbe University: Main Campus. Mzumbe University: Mbeya Campus College.
03	Saint Augustine University of Tanzania	Private	School of Law	Mwanza	Saint Augustine University of Tanzania: Main Campus.
04	Open University of Tanzania	Public	Faculty of Law	Dar es Salaam	Distance Learning.
05	Ruaha Catholic University	Private	Faculty of Law	Iringa	Ruaha Catholic University: Main Campus.
06	Tumaini University Makumira	Private	Faculty of Law	Arusha	Tumaini University Makumira: Main Campus.
07	University of Dodoma	Public	Faculty of Law	Dodoma	University of Dodoma : College of Humanities and Social Sciences Campus.
08	Muslim University of Morogoro	Private	Faculty of Law and Shariah	Morogoro	Muslim University of Morogoro: Main Campus.
09	University of Iringa	Private	Faculty of Law	Iringa	University of Iringa: Main Campus.
10	University of Bagamoyo	Private	College of Law	Dar es Salaam	University of Bagamoyo: Main Campus.
11	Moshi Co-operative University	Public	Faculty of Law	Moshi	Moshi Cooperative University: Main Campus.
12	Sebastian Kolowa Memorial University	Private	Faculty of Law	Lushoto	Sebastian Kolowa Memorial University: Main Campus.
13	Teofilo Kisanji University	Private	Faculty of Law	Mbeya	Teofilo Kisanji University: Main Campus.
14	Archbishop James University College	Private	Faculty of Law	Songea	Archbishop James University College: Main Campus.
15	Archbishop Mihayo University College of Tabora	Private	Faculty of Law	Tabora	Archbishop Mihayo University College of Tabora: Main Campus.
16	Jordan University College	Private	Faculty of Law	Morogoro	Jordan University College: Main Campus.
17	Kampala International University Dar es Salaam College	Private	Faculty of Law	Dar es Salaam	Kampala International University Dar es Salaam College: Main Campus.
18	Stella Maris Mtwara University College	Private	Faculty of Law	Mtwara	Stella Maris Mtwara University College: Main Campus.
19	Tumaini University Dar es Salaam College	Private	Faculty of Law	Dar es Salaam	Tumaini University Dar es Salaam College: Main Campus.

== See also ==
- List of universities and colleges in Tanzania
- Tanzania Commission for Universities
