= Hashil Abdallah =

Permanent Secretary of Trade and Industry

Lecturer Hashil Abdallah

Permanent Secretary Ministry of Industry and Trade
- Incumbent
- Assumed office 14 December 2022
- President: Samia Suluhu Hassan
- Preceded by: Prof. Godius W. Kahyarara

Personal details
- Education: Institute of Judicial Administration; Law School of Tanzania; Zanzibar University; Ruaha Catholic University
- Profession: Academician; Civil Servant
- Known for: Advocate of Law; Criminal Law

Hashil Twaibu Abdallah is a Tanzanian academic Lecturer of Law and currently Permanent Secretary of Trade and Industry in Tanzania who was a deputy Permanent Secretary of Trade and Industry appointed by President Samia Suluhu Hassan on 6 April 2021. He was the Deputy Dean in the Faculty of Law and Head of Department of Criminal Law at the Open University of Tanzania for more than ten years.

== Career ==
In 2003, he acquired Diploma in Law from the Institute of Judicial Administration, Bachelor of Law in 2007 from the Zanzibar University and Postgraduate diploma in Law in 2008 from the Law school of Tanzania. He obtained his master's degree in Intellectual property in 2010 and Doctor of Philosophy in Law (PhD) from Ruaha Catholic University. He is also an Advocate of the High court of Tanzania, member of Tanganyika Law Society and East Africa Law Society.

== Selected works ==
- Abdallah, Hashil; Wawa, Anna (December 2019). The Role of ODL System in Promotion and Protection of the Right to Education for Women in Tanzania:Challenges and Prospects. SemanticScholar. S2CID 233340650.

== See also ==
- Elifas Bisanda – Vice Chancellor of Open University of Tanzania
- Tolly Mbwette – Tanzanian academic (1956-2020)
- Irene Tarimo – Tanzanian scientist, biologist and educator
