= Nyerere Bridge =

Monument and Bridge in Dar es Salaam Region, Tanzania

Nyerere Bridge Daraja la Nyerere (Swahili)
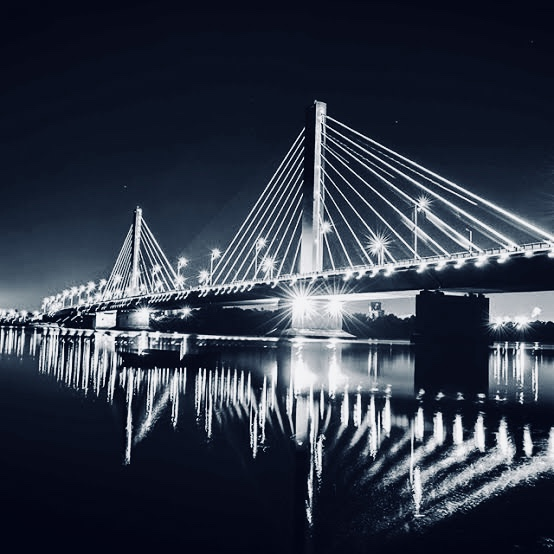
- Nyerere Bridge at night
- Coordinates: 6°51′33″S 39°17′59″E
- Carries: 6 lanes dual carriageway
- Crosses: Kurasini estuary
- Locale: Kurasini
- Owner: National Social Security Fund, government of Tanzania
- Website: www.nssf.or.tz

Characteristics
- Design: Cable-stayed bridge
- Total length: 680 metres (2,230 ft)
- Width: 27.5 metres (90 ft)
- Longest span: 200 metres (660 ft)

History
- Designer: Arab Consulting Engineers Moharram-Bakhoum "ACE"
- Constructed by: China Railway Jiangchang Engineering (T) Ltd & China Major Bridge Engineering Company
- Construction start: February 2012
- Construction end: April 2016
- Construction cost: US$ 136 million
- Opened: April 16, 2016
- Inaugurated: 16 April 2016, 19 April 2016

Location
- Interactive map of Nyerere Bridge

Nyerere Bridge (Swahili: Daraja la Nyerere), unofficially known as Kigamboni Bridge, is a 680-meter-long bridge located in the Dar es Salaam Region of Tanzania that connects the Temeke District's ward of Kurasini from the east to the west of Kigamboni District's Vijibweni ward across the Kurasini estuary. Construction work began in February 2012 and completed in April 2016.

The completion of the bridge has offered an alternative transport link to the new district of Kigamboni. Previously, the Kivukoni ferry provided a quick transport link between south east of the Dar es Salaam Central Business District specifically from south east of Kivukoni to north west of Kigamboni. The bridge has six lanes (three on each direction) and two pedestrians/cyclists lanes with width of 2.5 meters (one on each side). Construction of 2.5 km approach roads were completed with 1 km on the Kurasini side in Temeke District and 1.5 km on the Kigamboni side. The road joins the Nelson Mandela expressway through elevated free interchange to separate traffic approaching and leaving the junction. There is a toll plaza for controlling and charging of vehicles passing through the bridge. A total of 14 controlled lanes are going to be in this area (seven for each of the two directions).
