= Usangu Plain =

Lowland in south-central Tanzania

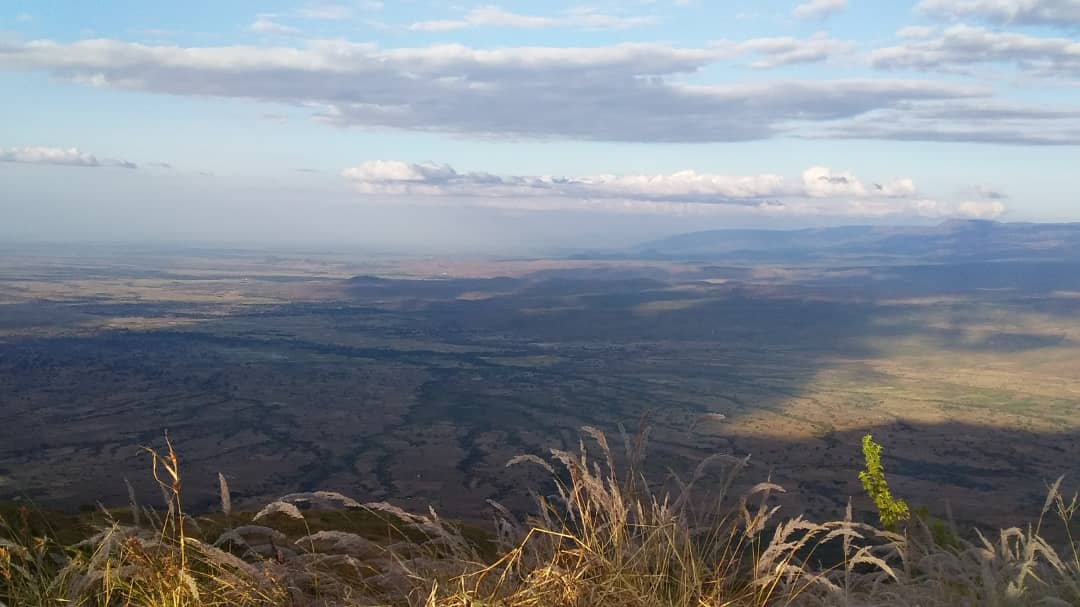

Geography
- Country: Tanzania
- State/Province: Iringa, Mbeya
- Coordinates: 8.56°S 34.2°E
- Interactive map of Usangu Plain

The Usangu Plain is a lowland in south-central Tanzania. It is named for the Sangu people.

== Geography ==
The Usangu Plain covers an area of 15,500 km^{2}. It extends northeast-southwest, bounded on the south by the Udzungwa Mountains, and the Kipengere Range on the southwest. Between the two ranges the Makambako Gap opens to the south. On the north, The Mbeya Mountains rise steeply to the northwest, and the lower Lupa upland further to the east. Further east the Usangu escarpment becomes less distinct, and the plain transitions into the plateau of central Tanzania.

The plain is drained by the Great Ruaha River and its tributaries.

== Geology ==
The Usangu Plain is the eastern branch of the East African Rift. The Usangu Fault scarp runs along the northern edge of the plain, where the Mbeya Mountains and Lupa upland meet the plain. The Chimala fault scarp marks the southern edge of the Usangu basin, defining the northern edge of the Kipengere and Udzungwa mountains.

== Ecology ==
Most of the region is in the Southern Acacia-Commiphora bushlands and thickets ecoregion, with extensive grasslands punctuated by woodlands of Acacia and Commiphora trees. There are areas of dry miombo woodland along the southern end of the plain, on the lower slopes of the plateaus and the Makambako Gap.

The Great Ruaha River forms extensive wetlands, some seasonal, in the middle of the plain.

Ruaha National Park occupies the eastern and central portion of the plain.

== People ==
Until the 1960s, the Sangu people were mostly pastoralists, grazing cattle on the plain with a communal form of land ownership. The Sangu were concentrated in the southern part of the plain, which was more amenable to cattle grazing. In the 1960s the Tanzanian government organized an irrigation project and developed three large rice farms on the plain, watered by streams originating in the western mountains. Some former communal grazing lands have been brought under state control. Now many Sangu make a living in agriculture. Many people from elsewhere in Tanzania have moved to the region to farm or graze livestock.
