= Sangu language =

Sangu language may refer to:

- Sangu language (Gabon) of Gabon (also spelled Chango, Isangu, Shango, Yisangou, and Yisangu)
- Sangu language (Tanzania) of Tanzania (also spelled Eshisango, Kisangu, Rori, Sangu, Sango)
