= Vijibweni =

Ward of the Kigamboni District in the Dar es Salaam Region of Tanzania

Vijibweni Kata ya Vijibweni (Swahili)
- Ward of Kigamboni District
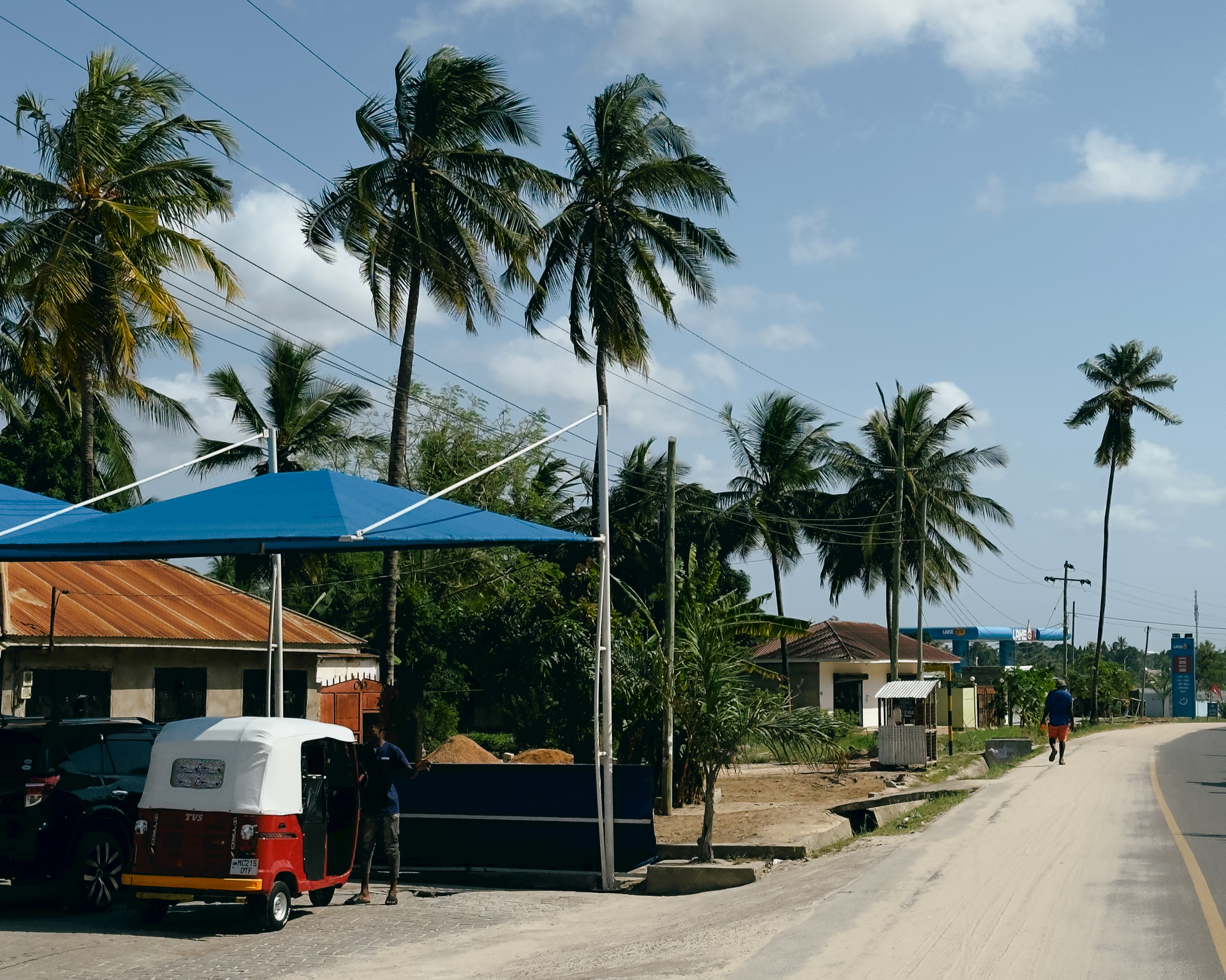
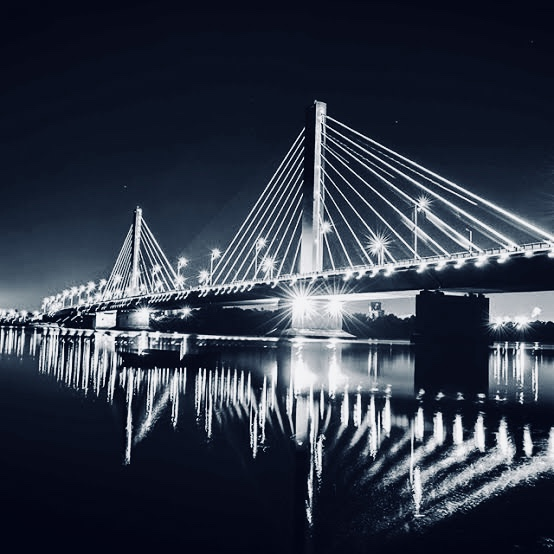
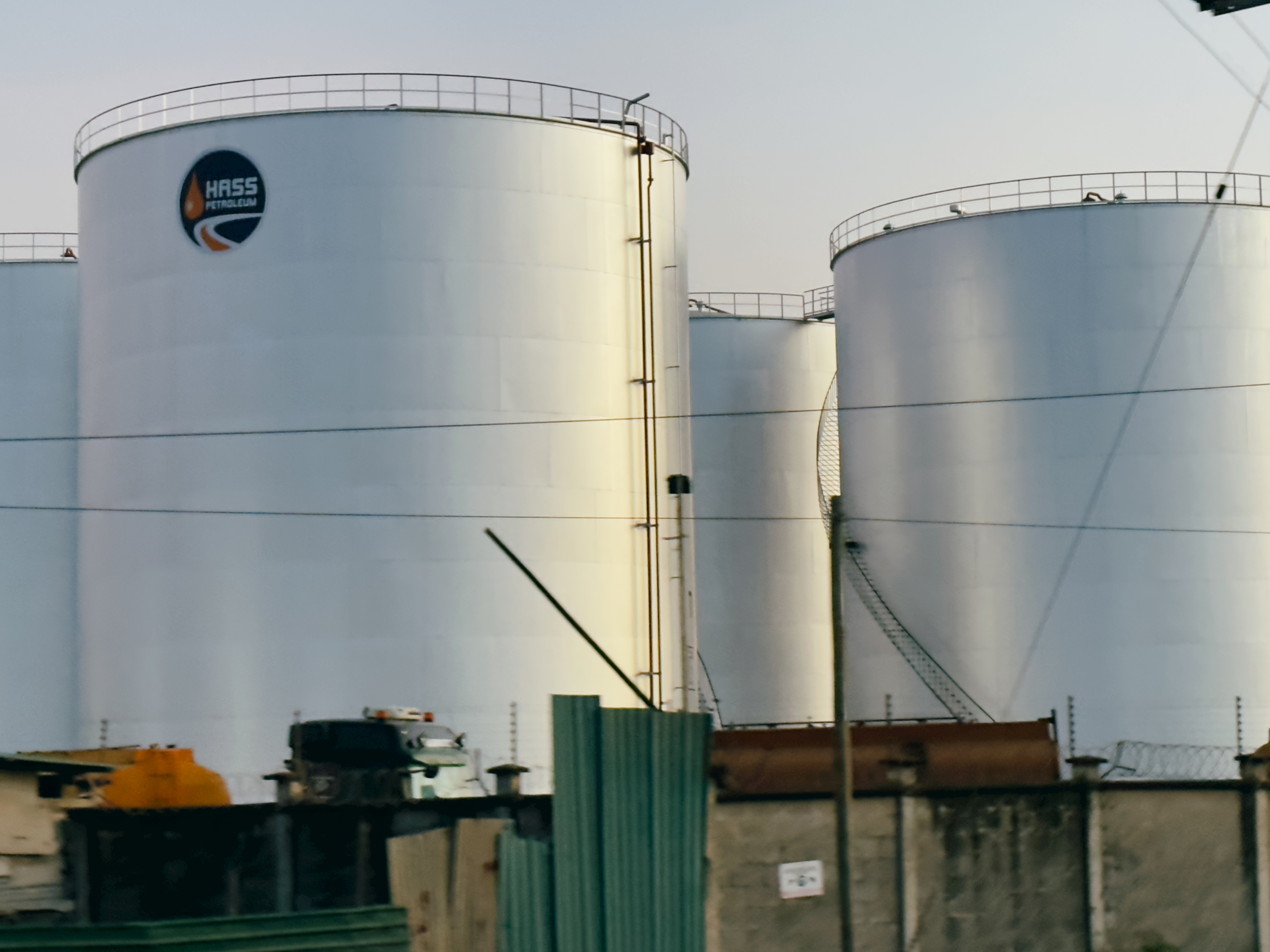
- From top to bottom: Scene in Vijibweni ward, Nyerere Bridge entering Vijibweni ward & Oil tanks in vijibweni
- Nickname: Kigamboni's industrial powerhouse
- Interactive map of Vijibweni
- Coordinates: 6°51′42.12″S 39°19′11.64″E
- Country: Tanzania
- Region: Dar es Salaam Region
- District: Kigamboni District

Area
  - Total: 16.6 km^{2} (6.4 sq mi)

Population (2012)
  - Total: 29,010

Ethnic groups
  - Settler: Swahili
  - Ancestral: Zaramo
- Tanzanian Postal Code: 17108

Vijibweni (Kata ya Vijibweni, in Swahili) is an administrative ward in the Kigamboni district of the Dar es Salaam Region of Tanzania. The Tungi and Mjimwema form the ward's northern and eastern borders, respectively. In the Temeke District, it is bordered to the south by Kibada and to the west by Kijichi, Mtoni, and Kurasini. Kurasini is connected to Vijibweni by the iconic Nyerere Bridge. With seven major firms situated there, Vijibweni is home to the largest manufacturing industries in the entire District. In 2016 the Tanzania National Bureau of Statistics report there were 36,327 people in the ward, from 29,010 in 2012.

== Administration ==
The postal code for Kibada Ward is 17108. The ward is divided into the following neighborhoods (Mitaa)/Villages (Vitongoji):

- Kibene
- Kisiwani, Vijibweni
- Majengo, Vijibweni

- Mkwajuni, Vijibweni
- Upendo, Vijibweni
- Vijibweni, Vijibweni

=== Government ===
The ward, like every other ward in the country, has local government offices based on the population served.The Vijibweni Ward administration building houses a court as per the Ward Tribunal Act of 1988, including other vital departments for the administration the ward. The ward has the following administration offices:

- Vijibweni Ward Police Station
- Vijibweni Ward Government Office (Afisa Mtendaji)
- Vijibweni Ward Tribunal (Baraza La Kata) is a Department inside Ward Government Office

In the local government system of Tanzania, the ward is the smallest democratic unit. Each ward is composed of a committee of eight elected council members which include a chairperson, one salaried officer (with no voting rights), and an executive officer. One-third of seats are reserved for women councillors.

== Demographics ==
Like much of the district, the ward is the ancestral home of the Zaramo people. The ward evolved into a cosmopolitan ward as the city progressed over time. 29,010 people lived in the ward as a whole in 2012.

== Education and health ==
=== Education ===
The ward is home to these educational institutions

- Vijibweni Primary School
- Kisiwani Primary School
- Vijibweni Secondary School
- Minazini Secondary School
- United African University of Tanzania, Vijibweni
- Bethania Primary School

=== Healthcare ===
The ward is home to the following health institutions:

- Nunge Health Center
- Vijibweni Hospital
