= Rose Funja =

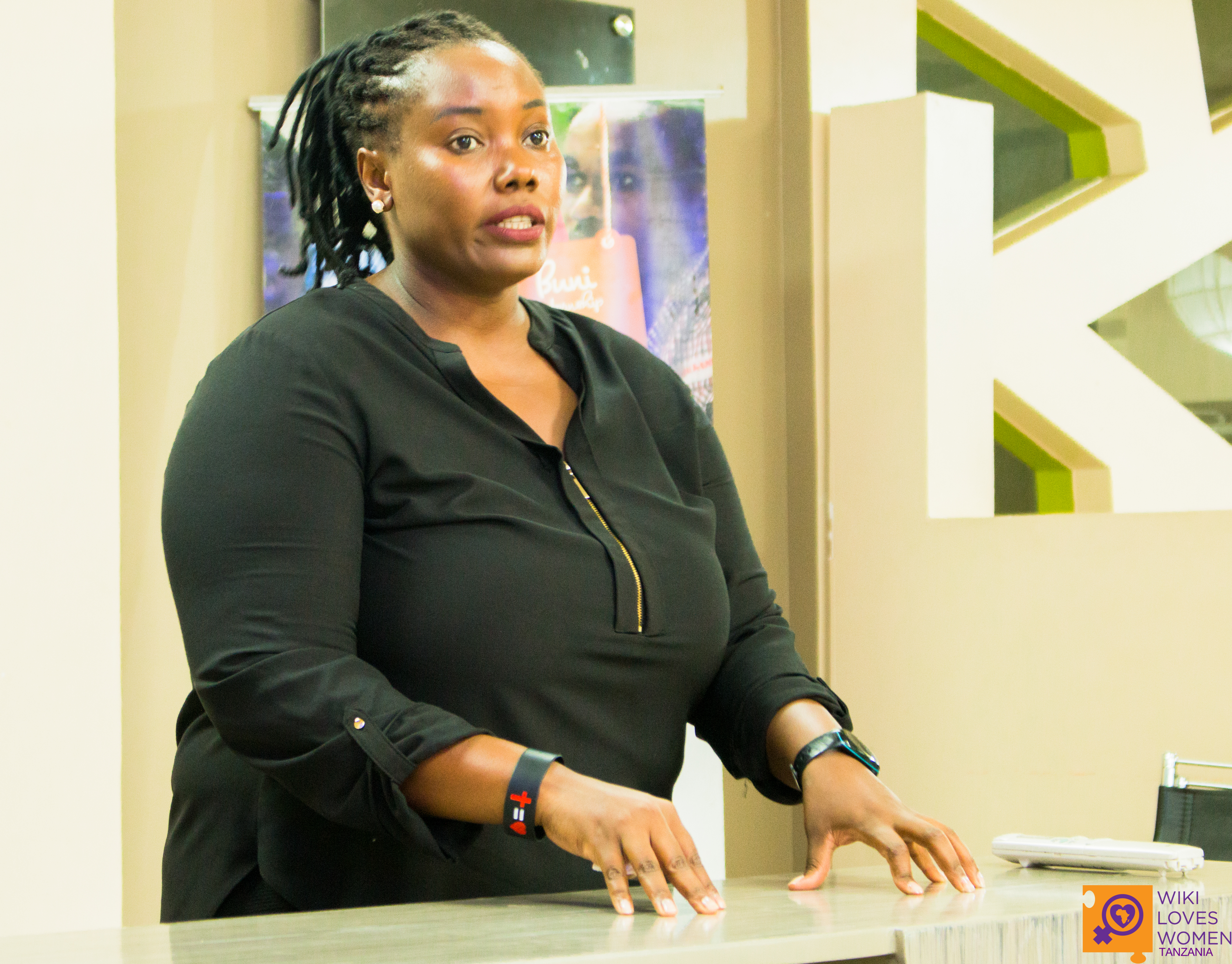
- Born: 1981 (age 44–45)
- Citizenship: Tanzania
- Education: University of Dar es Salaam
- Organization: Dean - University of Bagamoyo

Rose Peter Funja (born 1981) is a Tanzanian software engineer and developer. She was a dean at the College of Science at the University of Bagamoyo, lecturing on ICT.

She has been active since 2014 with one app ATIZAVO on Google Play. The name is a short form of Airtel, Tigo, Zantel and vodacom.

== Early life and education ==
Funja was born in 1981 and raised in Dar es Salaam. She attended the Kifungilo and Shaaban Robert School and the University of Dar es Salaam from where she received a Bachelor of Science in computer engineering in 2005, and a master's of engineering degree in Communication and Information Systems from Huazhong University of Science and Technology in 2008.

== Career ==
Funja worked with Huawei Technologies International as a Senior Product Manager in Shenzhen, China. She is experienced with wireless telecommunication technologies and pioneered projects in various countries and regions including China, Kenya, Rwanda, Madagascar, Zambia and Tanzania. Funja has been actively involved in Rotaract and served as the Club President when she was a student at the University of Dar es Salaam 2005.

In 2012 Funja returned to Tanzania and engaged in academia by lecturing at the University of Bagamoyo in science courses. She quickly climbed to the level of Dean at the College of Science and Environmental Sciences

Funja is a Mandela Washington Fellow, a President Obama Young African Leaders Initiative Program (YALI), where she attended a Public Management Course from Syracuse University in New York.

Funja has always seen information and communication as a solution to challenges facing the Tanzanian agricultural sector. With this focus she founded Agrinfo Company Limited. Agrinfo's initial idea was to serve as a search engine for agricultural information in Tanzania, and it has pivoted over the years to include technologies such as drones for agriculture as Funja is a trained drone pilot. Funja is the current managing Director of Agrinfo company limited.

== Community engagements and projects ==
Funja has co-founded several startups for technology, innovation and the empowerment of girls. She codes for change, aiming to transform information technology educational opportunities for girls in secondary schools, ages 13–19, through its training and mentorship programs and young women in colleges und Universities, ages 20–26.

Funja has also chaired the Buni Divaz community, representing a group of empowered Tanzanian girls under the TANZICT and COSTECH umbrella.

== Awards ==
Funja has received several awards including Malkia wa Nguvu - 2017 - Science and Technology. A regional winner of the 2013 ICT4Ag Conference Hackathon. In 2016 she received an innovator award by the Tanzanian Ministry of Communication for participation in the TanzICT project.

She was also recognized in the UN Women in the Young Innovators category for her innovations helping women in agriculture in 2014.
