= Lettowia =

Conservation status
- Endangered (IUCN 3.1)

Scientific classification
- Kingdom: Plantae
- Clade: Tracheophytes
- Clade: Angiosperms
- Clade: Eudicots
- Clade: Asterids
- Order: Asterales
- Family: Asteraceae
- Subfamily: Vernonioideae
- Tribe: Vernonieae
- Subtribe: Erlangeinae
- Genus: Lettowia; H.Rob. & Skvarla
- Species: L. nyassae

Binomial name
- Lettowia nyassae (Oliv.) H.Rob.

Synonyms
- Vernonia nyassae Oliv.

Genus of flowering plants

Lettowia is a genus of flowering plants in the family Asteraceae. It includes a single species, Lettowia nyassae, which is endemic to southeastern Tanzania.

Lettowia nyassae is a scapigerous perennial herb growing from a woody rootstock. It has basal rosette of numerous oblanceolate leaves, 2–8 cm long and .4 to 1.6 cm wide. Scapes are 6–30 cm tall, covered with long simple hairs which are denser on the upper part, with solitary or paired inflorescences at the top.

The species is endemic to the mountains of the Southern Rift in southeastern Tanzania. It is native to montane forest–grassland mosaic where it grows in burnt grasslands and wet meadows from 1,850 to 2,750 metres elevation. It is known from 14 localities, including the Mbeya Range Forest Reserve, with an extent of occurrence (EOO) of 3347.72 km^{2} and an area of occupancy (AOO) of 16 km^{2}. It is assessed as endangered, threatened by habitat loss from expansion of cropland, livestock grazing, and pine and tea plantations onto its native habitat.

The species was first described as Vernonia nyassae by Daniel Oliver in 1881. In 2013 Harold E. Robinson and John Jerome Skvarla placed the species in the newly-described monotypic genus Lettowia as Lettowia nyassae.
