= Ministry of Industry and Trade (Tanzania) =

Government ministry of Tanzania

- Wizara ya Viwanda na Uwezeshaji (Swahili)

Ministry overview
- Jurisdiction: Government of Tanzania
- Headquarters: Dodoma University Front Compound, Dodoma; 6°49′30″S 39°17′2.5″E
- Minister responsible: Kitila Mkumbo
- Deputy Minister responsible: Hashil Abdallah
- Ministry executive: Doto James, Permanent Secretary
- Website: mit.go.tz

The Ministry of Industry and Trade is a government ministry of Tanzania. Its offices are located in Dar es Salaam. The Minister is Kitila Mkumbo.

== History ==
The Ministry was previously renamed to the Ministry of Industry, Trade and Investment under John Magufuli, seemingly absorbing the investment role previously undertaken by the Prime Minister's Office for Investment and Empowerment. In January 2019, the Prime Minister's office reabsorbed the responsibility for investments with the appointment of Angellah Jasmine Kairuki to the new role. Following this, the Ministry renamed back to Industry and Trade.
