= Vignan Educational Foundation =

Registered trust established in Bangalore, Karnataka in 1991

Vignan Educational Foundation (VEF) is a registered trust established in Bangalore, Karnataka, India, in the year 1991.

Institutions run by VEF are Bangalore Institute of Dental Sciences & Hospital, Vignan Institute of Nursing, Katuri Medical College, Katuri College of Nursing, and International Medical and Technological University.
