= Loleza Mountain =

Mountain in Tanzania

- Location within Tanzania

Highest point
- Elevation: 2,809 metres (9,216 ft)
- Prominence: 1,020 m (3,350 ft)
- Listing: Ribu
- Coordinates: 08°51′18″S 033°25′15″E

Geography
- Location: Mbeya Region, Tanzania
- Parent range: Mbeya Range

Loleza Peak is a 2,809-metre-high (9,216 ft) mountain in Mbeya Region, Tanzania, East Africa. It is located in the Mbeya Range, just north of the city of Mbeya. It is the type locale for the moth Zamarada loleza.
