= Katuri Medical College =

Medical college in Guntur, India

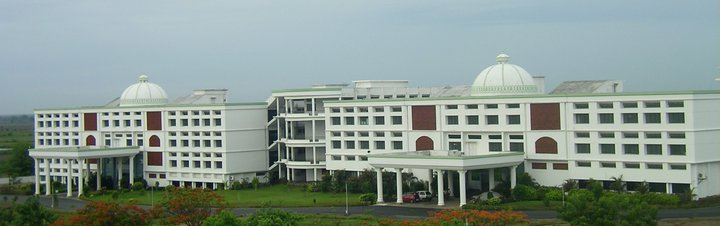
- Type: Medical College
- Established: 1997
- Location: Guntur City, AP, India; 16.2279°N 80.3095°E
- Campus: Suburban
- Website: https://katurimedicalcollege.org

Katuri Medical College & Hospital is one of the Private Medical colleges in Guntur, India, offering Postgraduate (Masters - MD/MS) and Undergraduate (Bachelors' - MBBS) courses in Medical Sciences. It is located on NH-5, towards Chilakaluripet, in the suburban area of Guntur south-west, at about 15 km from Guntur City.

== Departments ==
The college is recognized by the Medical Council of India. It is affiliated to the NTR University of Health Sciences, Vijayawada, with collaboration and close links to the International Medical and Technological University.

=== Departments under services ===
Hospital (Clinical):

- General medicine
- Respiratory Medicine
- Psychiatry
- Dermatology
- General Surgery
- Neurosurgery
- Orthopedics
- Physiotherapy
- Radiology
- Oncology
- Anesthesia
- Pediatrics
- OB&G
- ENT
- Ophthalmology
- Dentistry

College (Non clinical & Para clinical):

- Anatomy
- Physiology
- Biochemistry
- Pharmacology
- Microbiology
- Pathology
- Forensic Medicine
- Community Medicine
