= Abdulrahman Al-Sumait University =

University in Chukwani, Tanzania

- Swahili: Chuo Kikuu Kishiriki cha Elimu Zanzibar
- Abdulrahman Al-Sumait University
- Former names: University College of Education Zanzibar
- Motto: Ethics, Innovations, Entrepreneurship
- Type: [Private university]
- Established: 1998; 28 years ago
- Affiliations: The Consortium of Tanzania Universities Libraries and Research Libraries (COTUL). The Education and Research Network (TER NET)
- Chairman: Abdulrahman Al-Muhailan
- Chancellor: Amani Abeid Karume
- Vice-Chancellor: Professor Msafiri Mmasa Mshewa
- Academic staff: 52
- Students: 1,008
- Location: Zanzibar, Chukwani, Zanzibar Islands, Tanzania, East Africa, Tanzania; 6.2296°S 39.2127°E
- Campus: Urban
- Website: sumait.ac.tz

Abdulrahman Al-Sumait University (SUMAIT University), formerly the University College of Education Zanzibar (UCEZ), was established in Tanzania in 1998 by the Africa Muslims Agency (AMA). Dr. Abdulrahman Hamoud Al-Sumait (1947–2013), for whom the university is named, was a founding member of the AMA. The university's main campus is located at Chukwani.

== Academic programs ==
SUMAIT University has four faculties: Education, Science, Arts and Social Studies, and Islamic Studies and Shari’ah. The school awards Bachelor of Arts with Education (BA. Ed.) and Bachelor of Science with Education (BSc. Ed.), Bachelor of Science in Information Technology (B.Sc. Inf. Tech.), Bachelor of Arts in Counseling Psychology which have approved by the Tanzania Commission for Universities (TCU).

== Center for Professional and Continuing Education ==
The Department of Continuing Education was established in 2014 to provide non-degree courses at Certificate and Diploma levels accredited by National Accreditation Council for Technical Education (NACTE).

== Centre for Research and Postgraduate Studies (CRPS) ==
The CRPS coordinates research, publication, consultancy activities, and postgraduate studies at the university. So far several books have been published by the center. In December 2017, the CRPS launched the university's first academic journal, SUMAIT University Journal (http://journal.sumait.ac.tz/) which carries academic articles in English, Arabic and Kiswahili languages and issued twice a year.

SUMAIT University was to introduce a Master of Arts in Shariah and Islamic Jurisprudence Programme, Zanzibar Mail Reports. The programme was expected to start at the university's main campus. It had been approved by the Tanzania Commission for Universities (TCU).

== SUMAIT University Journal (SUJ) ==
=== About the Journal ===
SUMAIT University Journal (SUJ) is a peer-reviewed multidisciplinary journal that is published by the Center of Research and Postgraduate Studies (CRPS), SUMAIT University, Zanzibar, Tanzania, with ISSN 2507-7864.

SUJ is an open-access journal (OAJ) published biannually in Arabic, English, and Swahili with articles in various research areas including, but not limited to, Islam, Art, Social Studies, Computer & Information Technology, Natural Science.

SUJ was first published in 2016 as a printed journal. Five printed issues of this journal have been published until December 2019, after which the journal went online (e-journal). This is to keep pace with modern advancements and to enable more searchers to access its articles from various areas all over the world.

=== Vision ===
To be a leading journal in publishing scientific research articles, and to contribute to research quality in various academic disciplines.

=== Mission ===
To promote the university role in raising and developing overall research standards based on methodological trends in various fields to meet the publication objectives.

=== Objectives ===
The objectives of SUJ are:

i) To disseminate innovative research findings from academics, researchers, and students.

ii) To be a bridge between research and development by publishing latest original research studies, approaches, techniques, reviews, and case studies.

iii) To produce authentic and qualitative research.

== Library ==
The University Library has about 13,000 volumes of books, subscribed journals and periodicals and newspapers. The library is a member of COTUL which supports students and staff to collaborate and share information with other Tanzanian Libraries. It is also connected with GUST library in Kuwait. The University E- Library has more than 50 computers.

== University ranking ==
According to January 2018 UniRank ranking, SUMAIT University is one of the top 31 universities in Tanzania while webometric ranking has ranked SUMAIT University as one of the country's top universities as well as one of the top 200 universities in Africa.
