= Hubert Kairuki Memorial University =

Private medical university in Dar es Salaam, Tanzania

Coordinates: 6°46′23″S 39°15′18″E

- Chuo Kikuu cha Kumbukumbu cha Hubert Kairuki (Swahili)
- Former names: Mikocheni International University
- Motto: Training. Service. Research.
- Type: Private
- Established: 1997; 29 years ago
- Affiliations: IAU
- Chairman: Prof. Fredrick Kaijage
- Chancellor: Anna Makinda
- Vice-Chancellor: Prof. Yohana Mashalla
- Location: Dar es Salaam, Tanzania
- Campus: Urban
- Website: www.hkmu.ac.tz

The Hubert Kairuki Memorial University (HKMU) is a private medical university located in Mikocheni ward of Kinondoni District of Dar es Salaam, Tanzania. It is an accredited university recognized by the government Tanzania through the Tanzania Commission for Universities (formerly known as the Higher Education Accreditation Council, HEAC). HKMU is a World Health Organization recognized medical university and appears in the International Medical Education Directory (IMED).

== History ==
The university was established in 1997 by Hubert Mwombeki Kairuki (1940 - 1999), a Tanzanian obstetrician-gynecologist, educator and chairman of African evangelist enterprises. It was first named Mikocheni International University of Health Sciences (MIUHS), then Mikocheni International University, and received its present name in 1999. It was the first private university to be accredited in Tanzania, in June 2000.

== Location ==
The HKMU campus is at plot No 322 Regent Estate in Mikocheni, some seven km from the Dar es Salaam city centre. HKMU has easy access to several major tourist attractions in Tanzania, including Bagamoyo, Saadani, Mikumi, the Selous game reserve, and Zanzibar.

== Academics ==
HKMU offers degrees, diplomas and certificates in the following courses:

=== Undergraduate degree programmes ===
- Doctor of Medicine (5 years)
- Bachelor of Science in Nursing (4 years)
- Bachelor of Social Work (3 years)

=== Postgraduate programmes ===
- Master Of Medicine (MMED ) (3 years) in Paediatrics and Child Health
- Master of Medicine in Obstetrics and Gynaecology
- Master of Medicine in General Surgery
- Master of Medicine in Internal Medicine
- Master of Science in Public Health (MSCPH)

=== Diplomas ===
- Diploma in Nursing (Pre-service programme) (3 years).
- Diploma in Nursing for In Service programme (through e-learning) (2 years).
- Diploma in Social Work

=== Certificates ===
- Certificate in Nursing (2 years)
- Certificate in Midwifery (6 Months)

== See also ==
- Education in Tanzania
