= Sangu language (Tanzania) =

Bantu language spoken in Tanzania

Sangu
- Kisangu
- Native to: Tanzania
- Native speakers: (75,000 cited 1987)
- Language family: Niger–Congo?: Atlantic–Congo; Benue–Congo; Bantoid; Bantu; Northeast Bantu; Bena–Kinga (G.60); Sangu

Language codes
- ISO 639-3: sbp
- Glottolog: sang1330
- Guthrie code: G.61
- Linguasphere: 99-AUS-ud

Sangu (also called Kisangu, Kisango, Kirori, Eshisango, Rori, and Sango) is a language spoken in Tanzania by approximately 75,000 (1987) Sangu people.
