= Mbeya Range =

Mountain range

Coordinates: 8°50′S 33°22′E

City inside the Mbeya range

Mbeya Range is a volcanic mountain range in Mbeya Region, in southwestern Tanzania, East Africa. It forms an arc just north of the town of Mbeya and includes Loleza Peak (2656 m.), Mbeya Peak (2895 m.), Nyanuwa Peak (2332 m.), and Pungulumo (1909 m.). The range is at the junction of the eastern Gregory Rift and western Albertine Rift valleys. and is in Rungwe volcanic province. The Songwe Scarp terminates the Rukwa Trough at its southeast end and forms the northwestern side of the Mbeya Range.

The Poroto Mountains and Mount Rungwe lie to the south, and the Kipengere Range to the southeast.

== Ecology ==
Overgrazing and extensive wood cutting have in the mountains resulted in unstable slopes which has caused increased surface runoff, soil erosion, and land degradation.
