= Katavi University of Agriculture =

Public university in Katavi, Tanzania

Coordinates: 7.09929°S 31.163792°E

- Type: Public
- Location: Mpanda, Katavi Region, Tanzania

Katavi University of Agriculture is a public university. It is located in Katavi, Tanzania.
