= Kurasini =

Ward of Temeke District, Dar es Salaam Region

Kurasini Kata ya Kurasini (Swahili)
- Ward of Temeke District
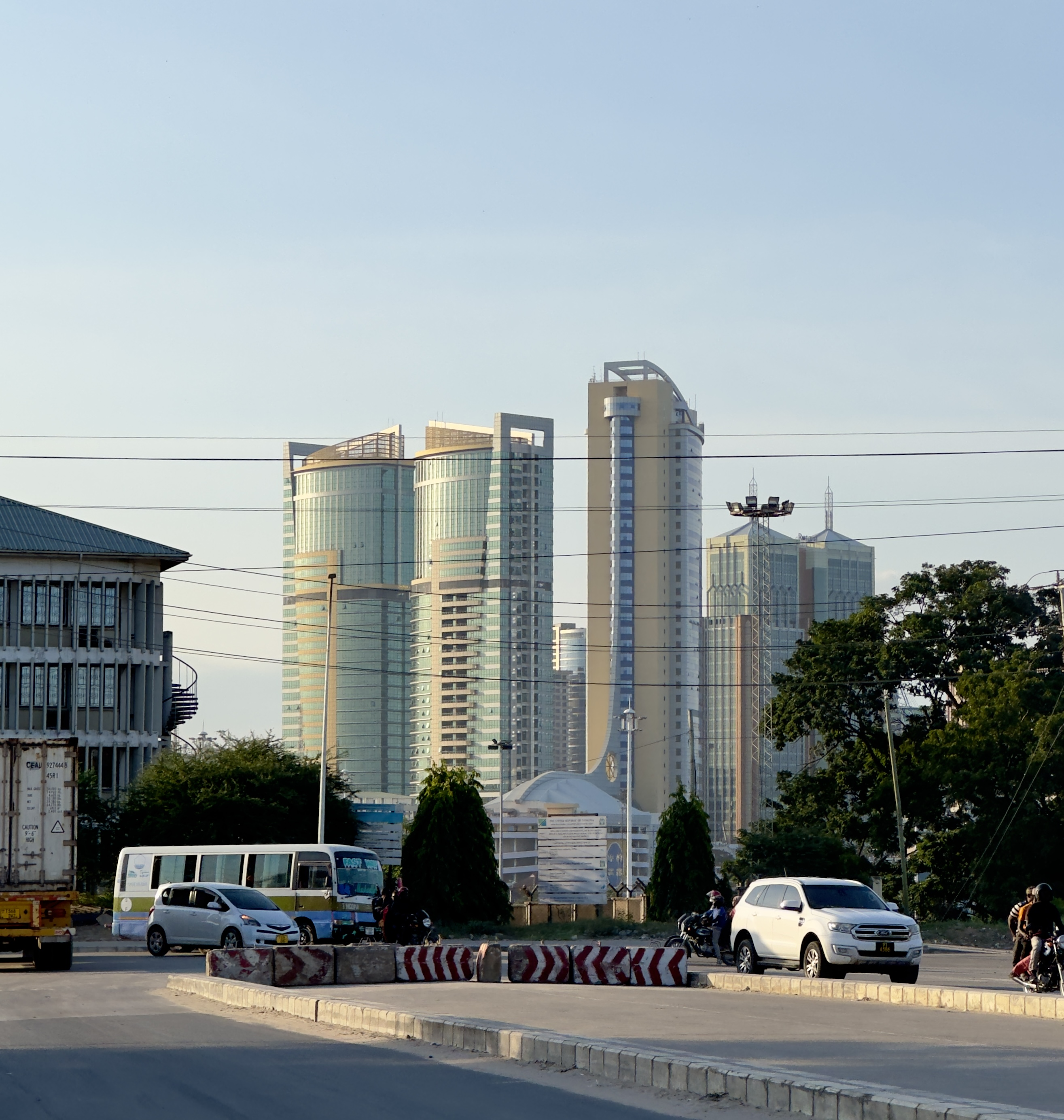
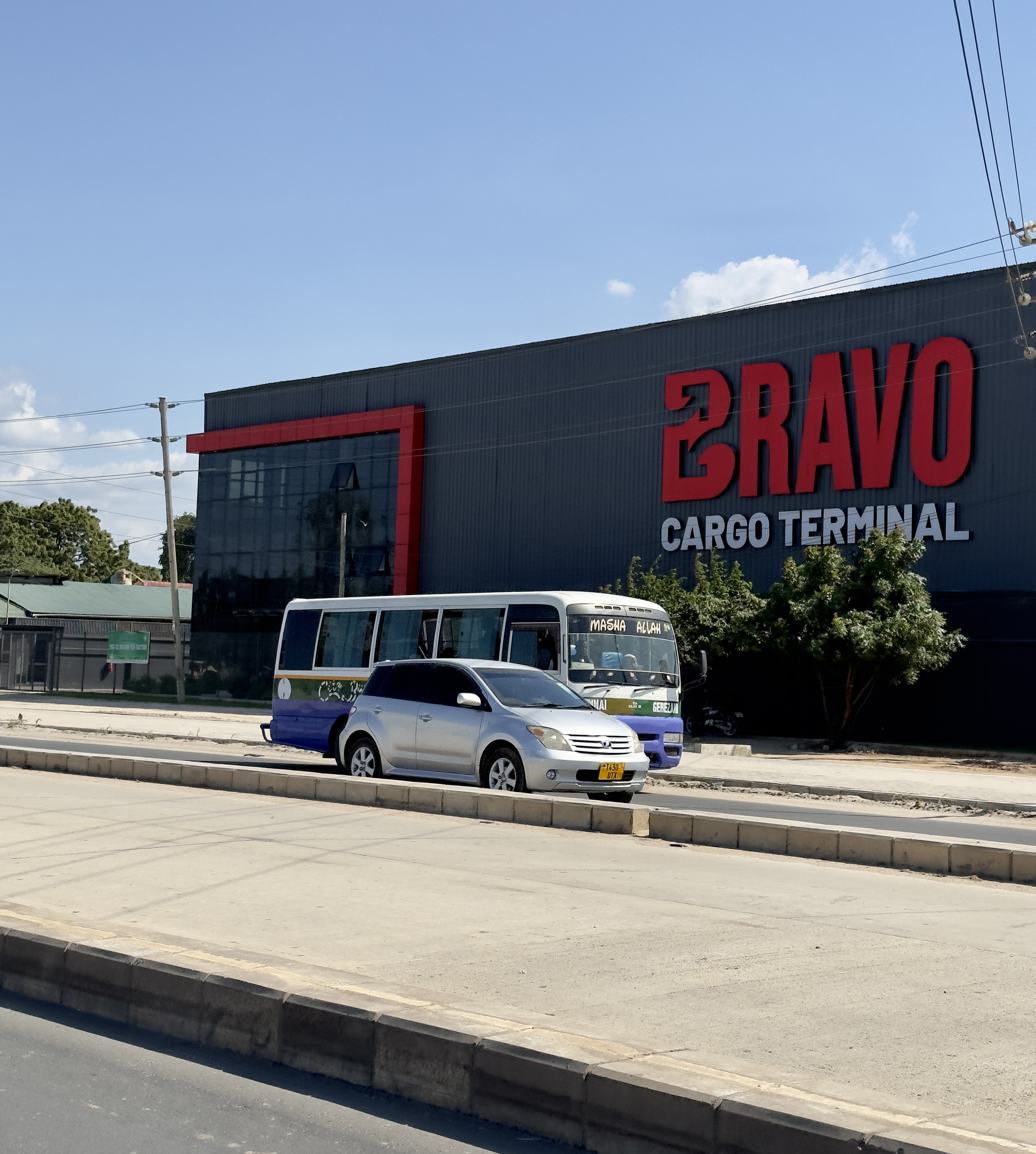
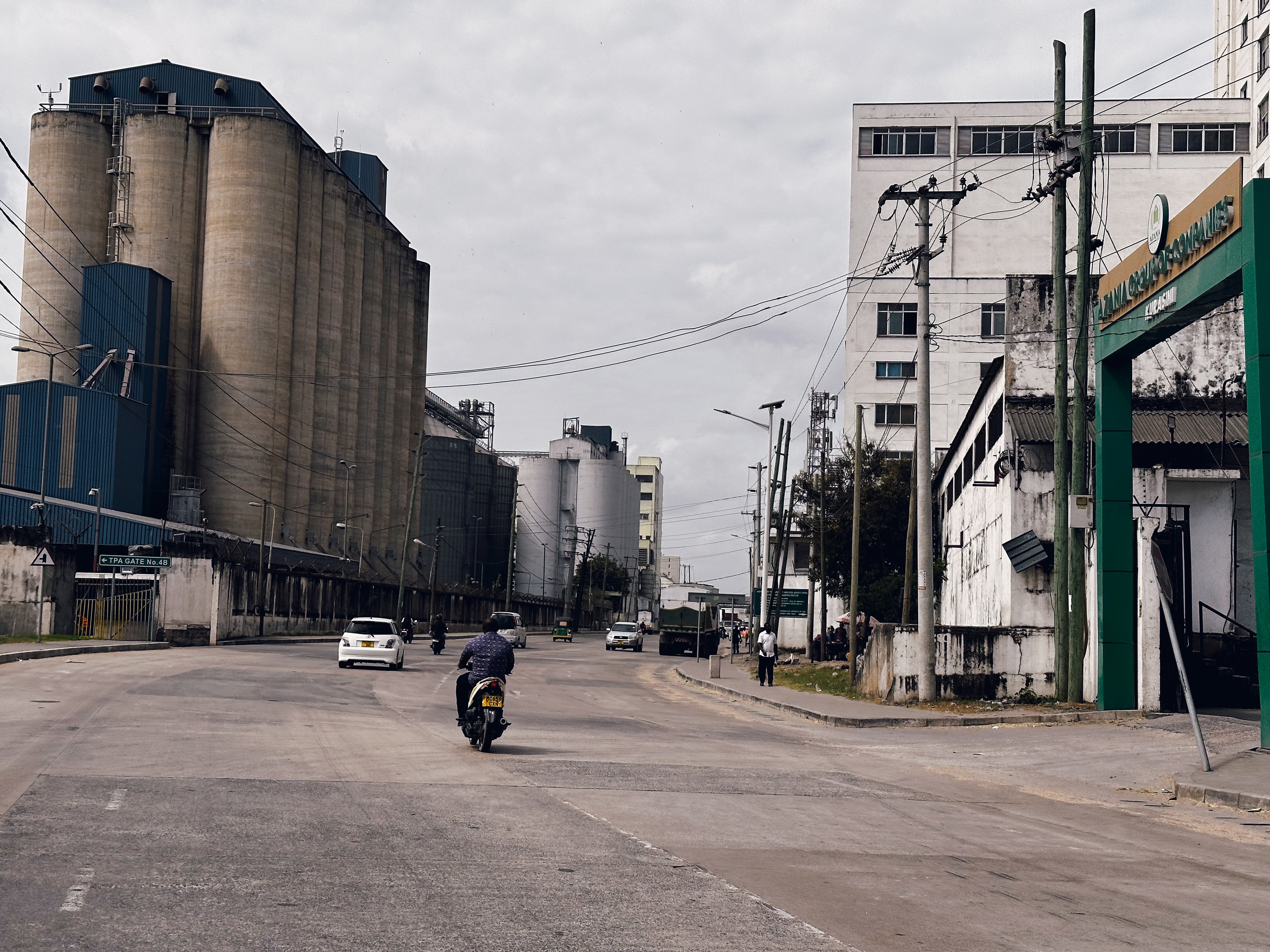
- From top to bottom: View of Ilala MC from Kurasini ward, Cargo business in Kurasini ward and Street in Kurasini ward
- Interactive map of Kurasini
- Coordinates: 6°49′49.8″S 39°17′9.96″E
- Country: Tanzania
- Region: Dar es Salaam Region
- District: Temeke District

Area
  - Total: 5.6 km^{2} (2.2 sq mi)

Population (2012)
  - Total: 26,193

Ethnic groups
  - Settler: Swahili
  - Ancestral: Zaramo
- Tanzanian Postal Code: 15109

Kurasini (Kata ya Kurasini, in Swahili) is an administrative ward in the Temeke district of the Dar es Salaam Region of Tanzania. Home of The Dar es Salaam Port, It is the location of the Port of Dar es Salaam; the fourth-largest port in Africa on the Indian Ocean, The National Police College, the Mgulani Police Barracks, Tanzania Immigration Headquarters, Diplomacy College and the Dar es Salaam International Trade Fair Grounds. Kurasini, under the British occupation of Tanganyika was built before 1940 for European port officials only . According to the 2012 census, the ward has a total population of 26,193.

== Administration ==
The postal code for Kurasini Ward is 15109. The ward is divided into the following neighborhoods (Mitaa):

- Kiungani
- Kurasini
- Minazini

- Mivinjeni
- Shimo la Udongo

=== Government ===
Like every other ward in the country, the ward has local government offices based on the population served. The Kurasini Ward administration building houses a court as per the Ward Tribunal Act of 1988, including other vital departments for the administration of the ward. The ward has the following administration offices:

- Kurasini Ward Police Station
- Kurasini Ward Government Office (Afisa Mtendaji)
- Kurasini Ward Tribunal (Baraza La Kata) is a Department inside Ward Government Office

In the local government system of Tanzania, the ward is the smallest democratic unit. Each ward comprises a committee of eight elected council members, including a chairperson, one salaried officer (with no voting rights), and an executive officer. One-third of seats are reserved for women councilors.

== Demographics ==
The ward serves as the Zaramo ancestral home along with a sizable chunk of the district. The ward changed over time as the city grew, becoming a cosmopolitan ward.

== Education and health ==
=== Education ===
The ward is home to these educational institutions:

- Kurasini Primary School
- Kiungani Primary School
- Kurasini Secondary School
- Uhamiaji Secondary School

=== Healthcare ===
The ward is home to the following health institutions:

- Kurasini Health Center
