= University of Iringa =

Private university in Iringa City, Iringa Region

Coordinates: 7°44′28″S 35°43′32″E

- Swahili: Chuo Kikuu cha Iringa
- Former names: Tumaini University - Iringa University College
- Type: Private
- Established: 1998; 28 years ago
- Affiliations: Lutheran
- Vice-Chancellor: Prof. Edward G Hoseah
- Academic staff: 100
- Students: 12,000
- Location: Iringa, Tanzania
- Campus: Urban
- Nickname: UoI
- Website: uoi.ac.tz

University of Iringa (formerly Tumaini University, Iringa University College) is now a full-fledged University. The University operates as a private university under the ownership of the Evangelical Lutheran Church of Tanzania.
