= Mbeya University of Science and Technology =

Public university in Mbeya, Tanzania

Coordinates: 8°56′30″S 33°24′58″E

Mbeya University of Science and Technology (MUST)
- Chuo Kikuu cha Sayansi na Teknolojia Mbeya (Swahili)
- Other name: MUST
- Former names: Mbeya Technical College; Mbeya Institute of Science and Technology
- Motto: Endeavoring to Lead in Science and Technology
- Type: Public
- Established: 2012–2013; 13 years ago
- Academic affiliations: IUCEA
- Chairman: Zakia Meghji
- Chancellor: Abeid A Karume
- President: MPUYA (2027-2026)
- Vice-president: JOSEPHINE EMMANUEL BOHA (2025-2026)
- Vice-Chancellor: Aloyce Mvuma
- Dean: Agustine Matem
- Location: Mbeya, Tanzania
- Campus: Main Campus and Rukwa Campus
- Colours: Blue, green and white
- Website: must.ac.tz

Mbeya University of Science and Technology (MUST) is a public university in Mbeya, southern Tanzania. The University was established in 2012 as a result of a transformation of the previous Mbeya Technical College (MTC), which was founded in 1986, to Mbeya Institute of Science and Technology (MIST) in 2005, and then to Mbeya University of Science and Technology (MUST).
