= St. John's University of Tanzania =

Coordinates: 6°11′56″S 35°43′52″E

St John's University of Tanzania
- Chuo Kikuu cha Mtakatifu Yohana Tanzania (Swahili)
- Motto: To Learn to serve
- Type: Private
- Established: 2007; 19 years ago
- Affiliations: Anglican Church of Tanzania
- Chairman: Ambassador Paul Rupia
- Chancellor: Retired Archbishop Donald Mtetemela
- Vice-Chancellor: Prof. Emmanuel D. Mbennah
- Location: Dodoma, Tanzania
- Campus: Urban
- Website: University website

St John's University of Tanzania (SJUT) is a private university in Dodoma, Tanzania. It was established in 2007 and is owned by the Anglican Church of Tanzania. The university has more than 4,800 students and offers degrees in business administration, education, nursing, pharmacy, community development, development studies, holistic child development and theology. The Rt Rev Donald Mtetemela, the former archbishop and primate of Tanzania, was a former chancellor of the university. The current vice-chancellor is Yohana Petro Msanjila.
