= Mbeya =

City in Mbeya Region, Tanzania

- City of Mbeya Region
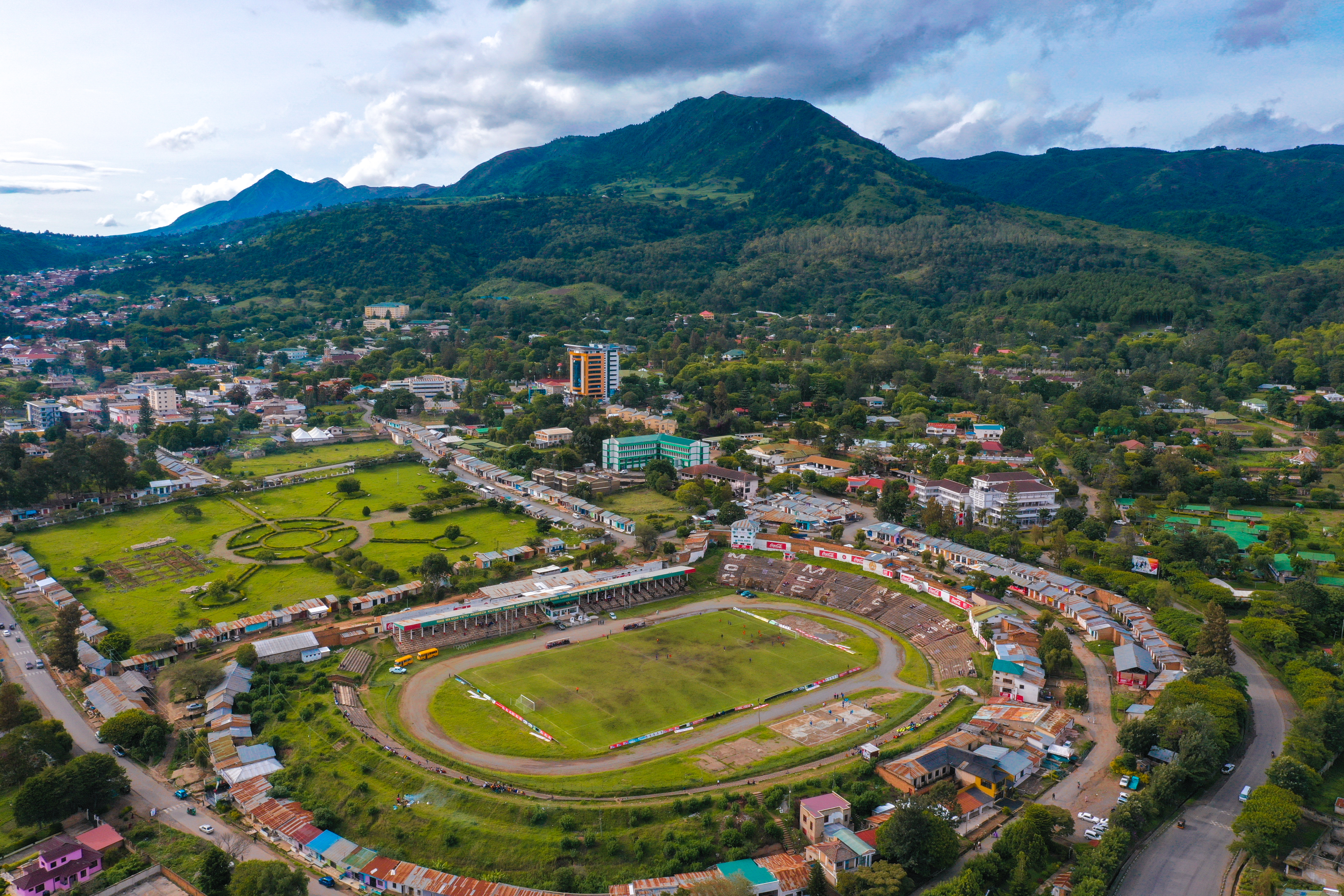
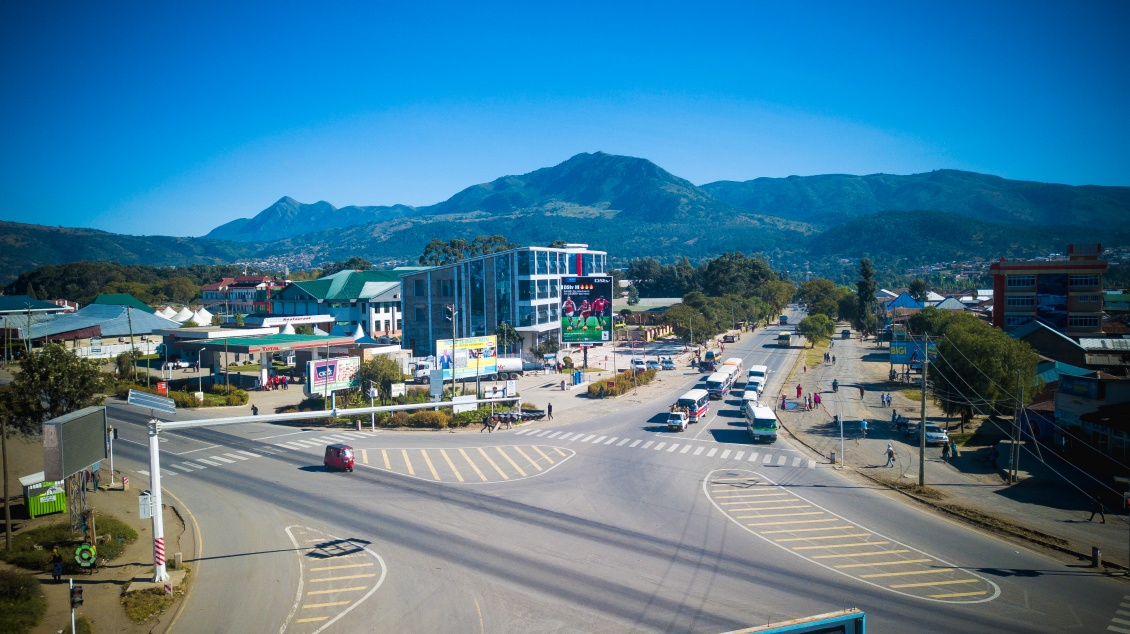
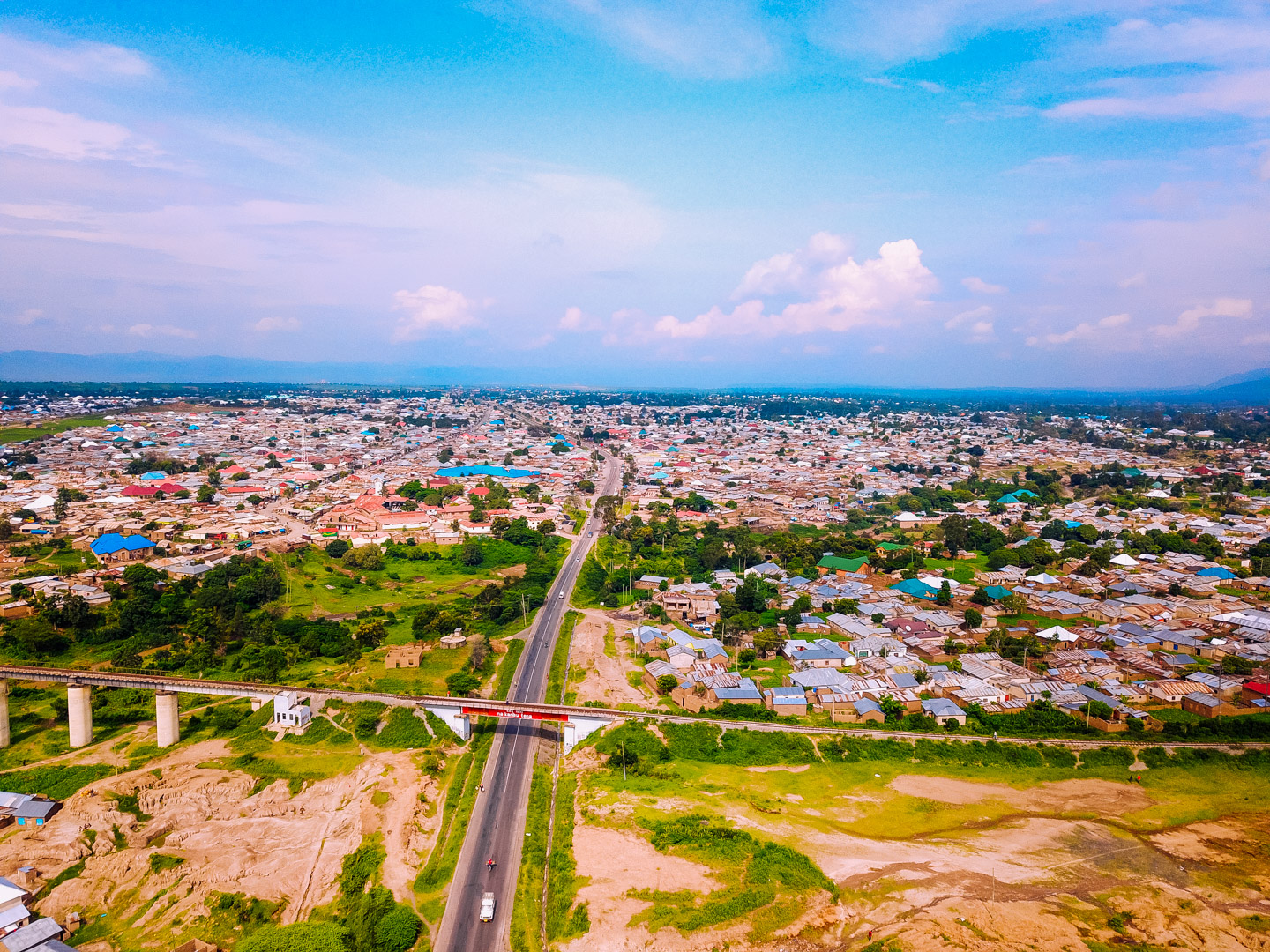
- From top: the mountains surrounding Mbeya, Mbeya City roads, and an aerial view of Mbeya City

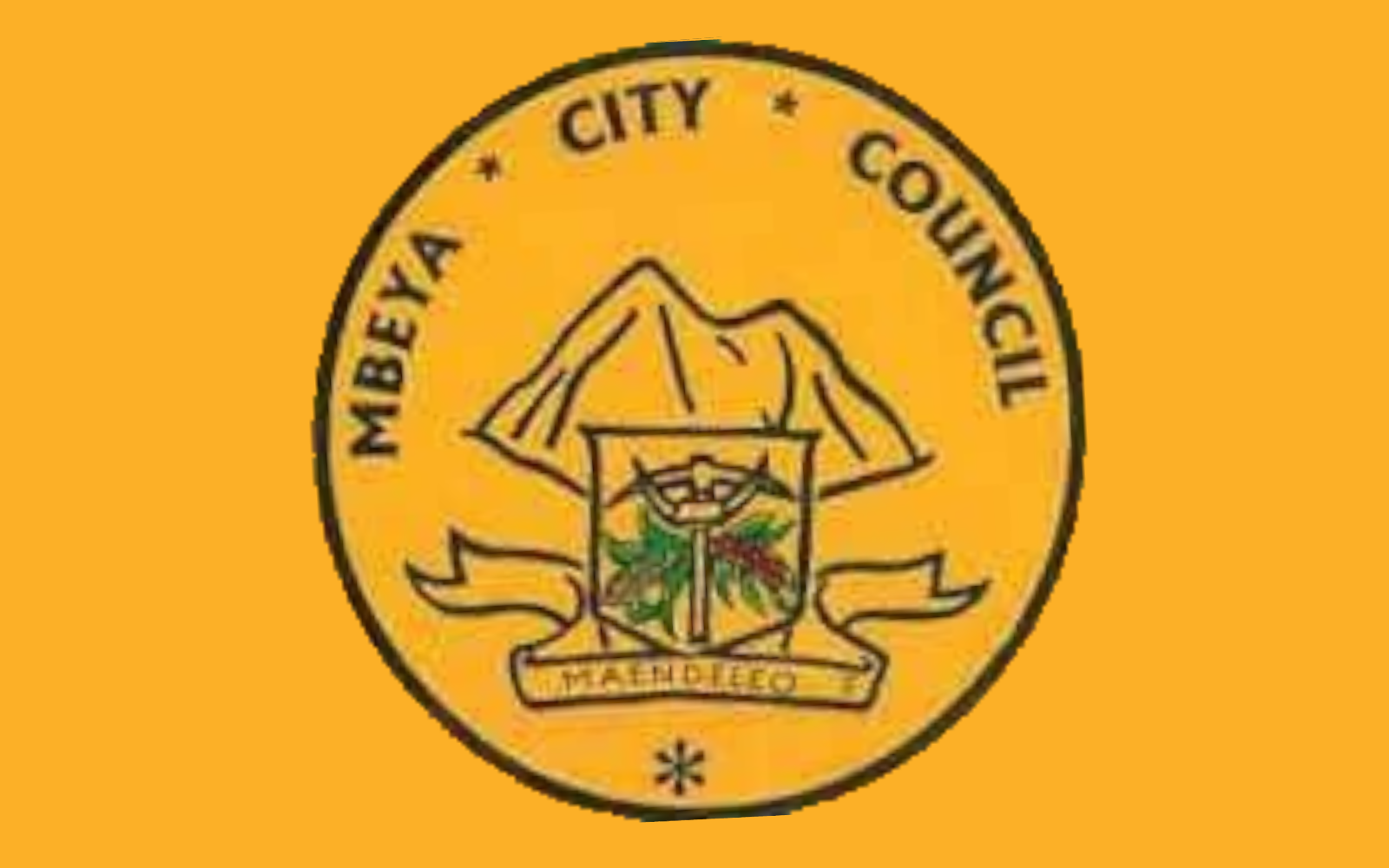
- Flag

- Location of Mbeya Mbeya (Africa)
- Coordinates: 08°54′00″S 33°27′00″E
- Country: Tanzania
- Region: Mbeya
- District: Mbeya Urban
- Incorporated city: 1 July 2005

Government
  - Mayor: David Mwashilindi

Area
  - Urban: 97.5 sq mi (252.5 km^{2})

Population (2022 census)
  - Urban: 541,603
  - Urban density: 5,555/sq mi (2,145/km^{2})
- Time zone: UTC+3 (EAT)
- Area code: 025
- Climate: Cwb
- Website: Country website

Mbeya is a city located in south west Tanzania, Africa, with an urban population of 649,000 in 2023. Mbeya is the capital of the surrounding rural Mbeya region (population, with Mbeya, totals approx. 2 million).

Mbeya is situated at an altitude of 1,700 metres (5,500 ft), and sprawls through a narrow highland valley surrounded by a bowl of high mountains. The main language is colloquial Swahili, and the English language is extensively taught in schools.

== History ==
Following the 1906 gold rush, Mbeya was founded as a gold mining town in the 1920s. The TAZARA railway later attracting farming migrants and small entrepreneurs to the area. Mbeya and its district were administered by the British until 1961. Mbeya Region was created in 1961.

Mbeya City is now a growing metropolis and business centre for the southern regions and the neighbouring countries of Malawi, Zambia and Congo. The city is well connected with an all-weather road that forms part of the "Great North Road" running from Cape Town to Alexandria. The city has several tribes including the Safwa, Nyakyusa, Nyiha and Ndali all being agricultural peoples. Mbeya is one of the regions that form the bread basket of Tanzania.

== Economy and infrastructure ==
Local government is administered via the Mbeya Urban District authority and a Regional Commissioner.

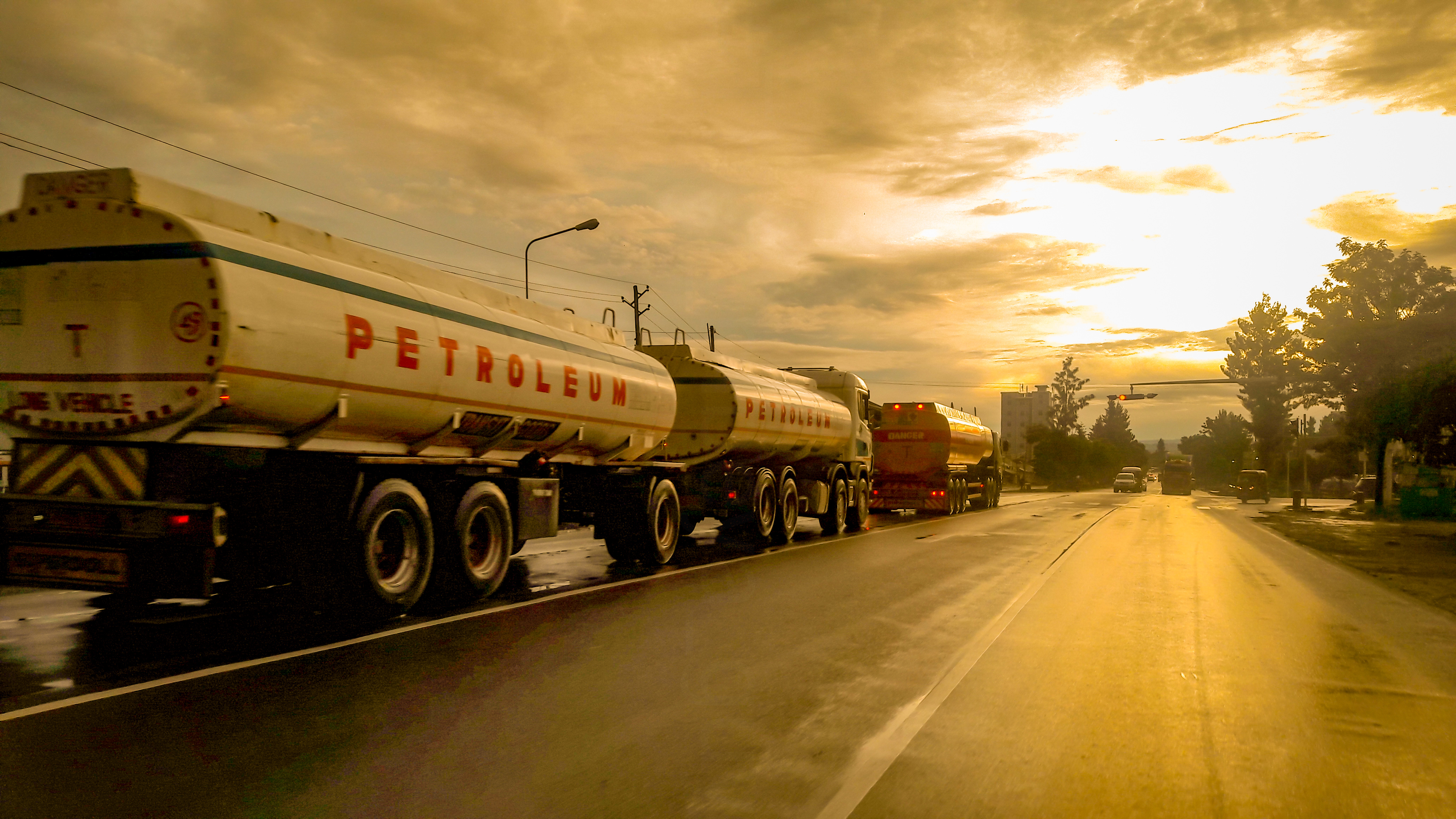
Fuel tank trucks in Mbeya.

Mbeya has weather with enough rainfall and fertile soil which enable it to be the largest producer of maize, rice, bananas, beans, potatoes (Irish and sweet), soya nuts and wheat in the entire country. Tanzania has a free market in agricultural produce, and Mbeya transports vast amounts of its maize to other areas of Tanzania. There is also extensive animal husbandry, with dairy cattle predominating. Mbeya is also the biggest producer of high-value export and cash crops in Tanzania; those crops are coffee (arabica), tea, cocoa, pyrethirum and spices. There is some smallholder cultivation of tobacco. Firewood is collected by women and girls, from the wooded valleys and mountainsides. Bamboo is naturally abundant in the forests, and there are plans to teach local people about this versatile plant and its many uses. Some gold is still mined in the rural Chunya District, by artisan miners.

Mbeya is considered to be heading the Southern Highlands regions. The Mbeya Referral Hospital which serves the whole of the Southern Highlands regions. The Bank of Tanzania, Mbeya Cement Company, Afri Bottlers Company Coca-Cola Company, SBC Tanzania Ltd Pepsi Cola Company, Tanzania Breweries Limited, NMB, TIB, Mbozi Coffee Curing Limited, Tukuyu Tea Company, Tanzania Oxygen Limited TOL - KYEJO, and CRDB serve as zonal representative for the Southern Highlands. There are also a number of companies and statutory organisations with zonal offices in Mbeya.

== Education ==
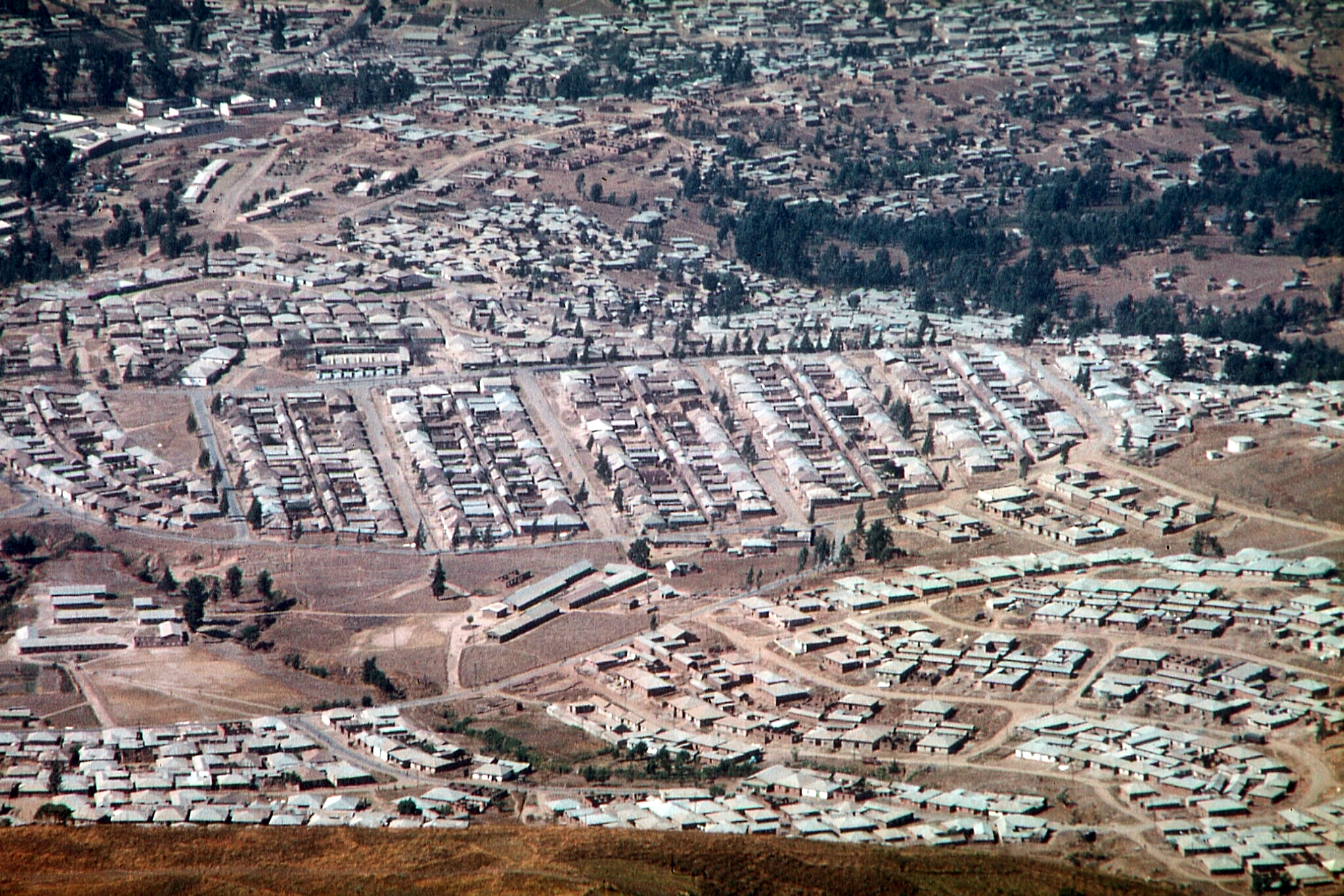
Mbeya city the capital of the surrounding rural Mbeya region

Besides a growing number of secondary schools, Mbeya has some institutes of higher learning education. Among the better known ones are the following five:

- Teofilo Kisanji University is a young institution of the Moravian Church in Tanzania offering courses in theology, business, arts, sciences, journalism and educational studies, as well as training pastors. Since 2005, it has grown out of the earlier Moravian Theological College. The college is situated at Soweto suburb.
- Mbeya University of Science and Technology (MUST) formerly known as Mbeya institute of Science and Technology (MIST) is a public institution offering degrees, advanced diplomas, and ordinary diplomas in various engineering disciplines. The college is at Iyunga area.
- Mzumbe University (MU) Mbeya Campus is situated in the forest area next to the Bank of Tanzania. This public University offers bachelor's degrees and diplomas in law and business, as well as evening programs in postgraduate studies.
- Catholic University College Of Mbeya (CUCoM): The TanzantheCommission for Universities (TCU) at its 116th meeting held on 26 October 2023 granted approval for the Catholic University College of Mbeya (CUCoM); this is situated in the forest area opposite to Tughimbe Hall. This university offers bachelor's degrees in education and Business administration, diploma in education, law, business administration information and communication technology, certificates in law, information and communication technology, business administration, grade IIIA and program in postgraduates studies.
- Tanzania Institute of Accountancy (TIA)-Mbeya campus offering different course such as certificate in accountancy, diploma and degree in accountancy and other related course with business operation. The college is located around the main road of Tanzania and Zambia and airport area. Then institute providing postgraduate program.
- College of Business Education (CBE), Mbeya campus is located at Isanga perpendicular to the Mbeya - Chunya - Rungwa road.
- University of Dar es Salaam, Mbeya College of Health and Allied Sciences (UDSM-MCHAS). This is a college of University of Dar es Salaam offering courses in health sciencies.

== Geography and climate ==
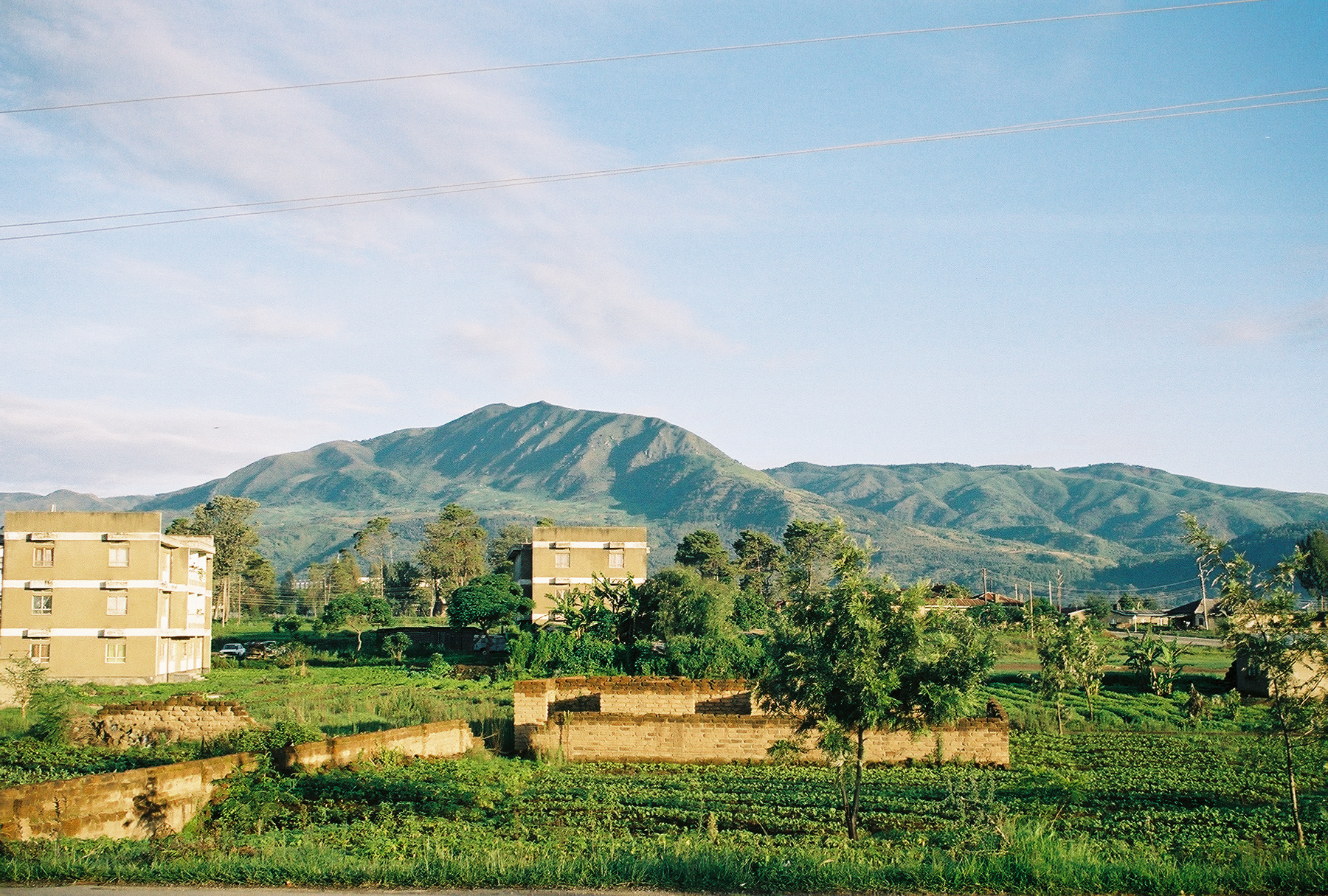
Loleza Mountain

Mbeya has a subtropical highland climate (Cwb, according to the Köppen climate classification), with humid summers and dry winters. The general range of temperature is between −6 °C or 21.2 °F during highlands mornings and 29 °C or 84.2 °F during lowland afternoons. The weather from June until October, is dry and cold. The heaviest rainfall occurs during the months of December to April, and annual rainfall averages approximately 900 millimetres or 35 inches.

Climate data for Mbeya
Month	Jan	Feb	Mar	Apr	May	Jun	Jul	Aug	Sep	Oct	Nov	Dec	Year
Mean daily maximum °C (°F)	24 (75)	23 (73)	23 (73)	23 (73)	22 (72)	21 (70)	21 (70)	22 (72)	25 (77)	27 (80)	27 (80)	25 (77)	23 (74)
Mean daily minimum °C (°F)	14 (57)	14 (57)	14 (57)	13 (55)	11 (52)	9 (48)	8 (46)	9 (48)	11 (52)	13 (55)	13 (56)	14 (57)	12 (53)
Average rainfall mm (inches)	190 (7.5)	160 (6.3)	160 (6.3)	110 (4.5)	18 (0.7)	0 (0)	0 (0)	2.5 (0.1)	2.5 (0.1)	15 (0.6)	56 (2.2)	140 (5.4)	854 (33.7)
Source: Weatherbase

The area around Mbeya town (especially in Tukuyu) enjoys abundant and reliable rainfall which stimulates abundant agriculture on the rich volcanic soils.

=== Mountain reserves and wildlife ===
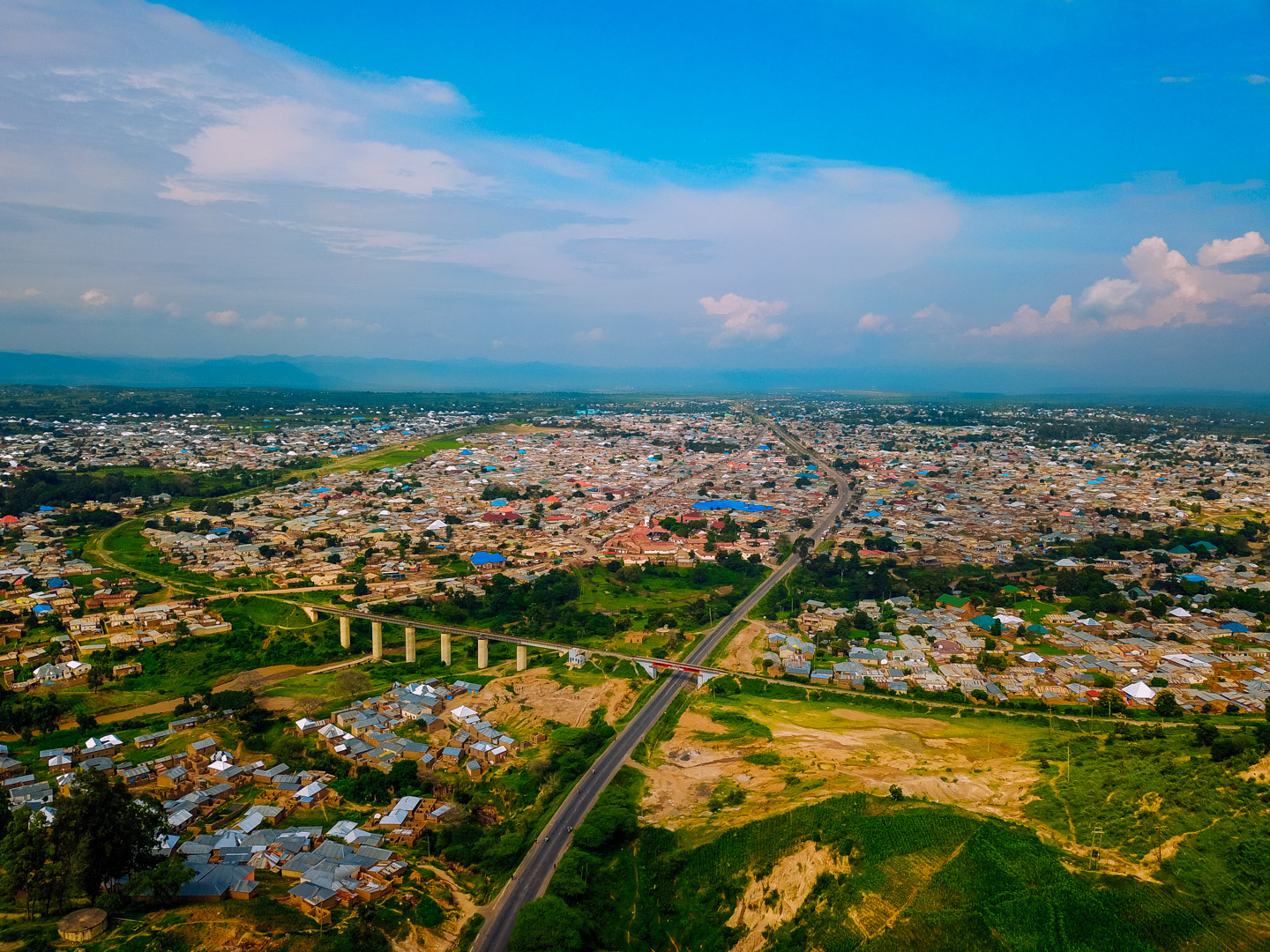
An aerial view of Mbeya.

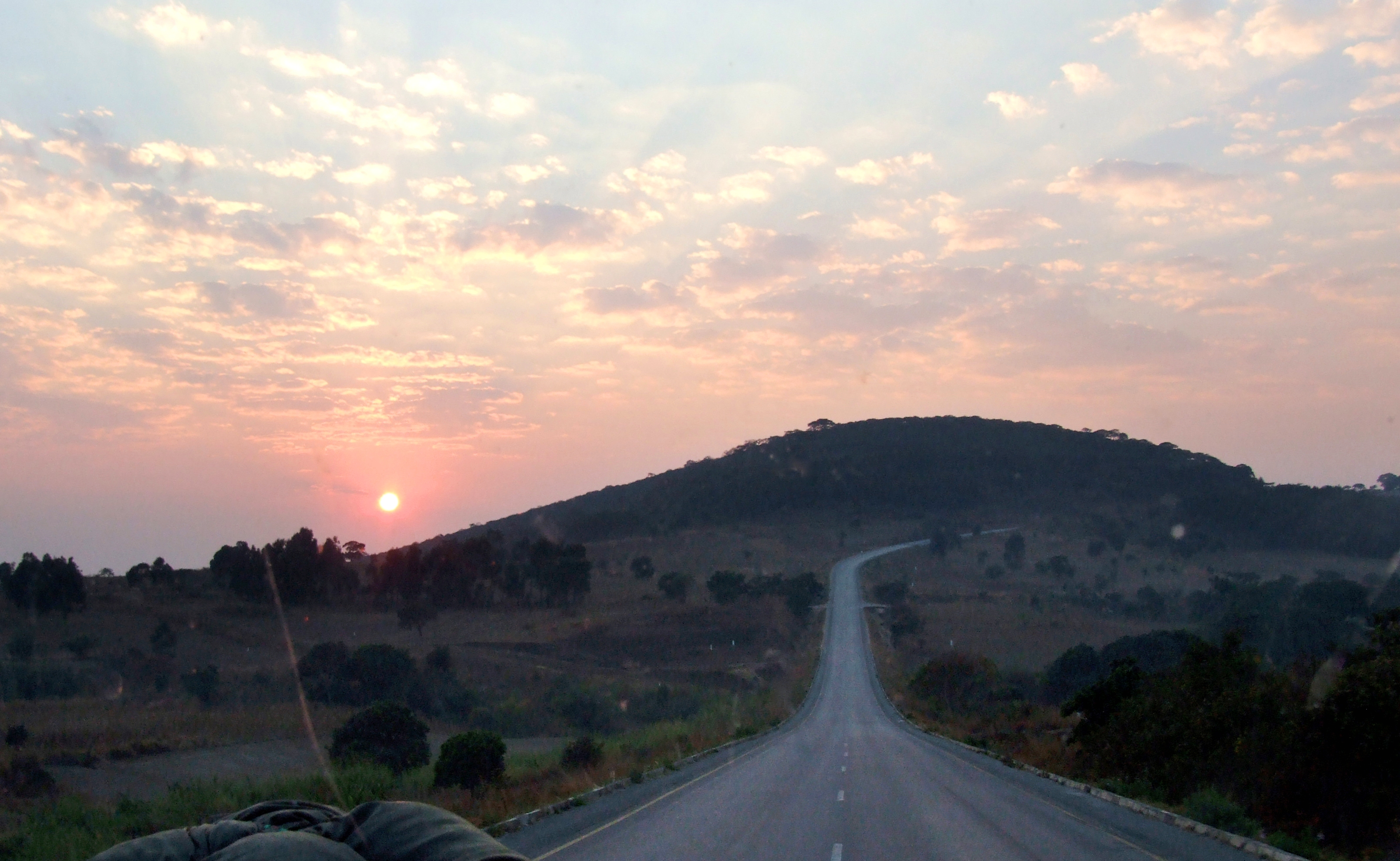
The road outside of Mbeya.

The area around Mbeya has been called the "Scotland of Africa". The hills are clad in heather and bracken, but botanically they are more closely related to the Fynbos (fine bush) of South Africa's Western Cape Province than the Highlands of Scotland. The nearest mountain to Mbeya is Loleza Mountain, which rises over and behind the town. Mbeya Peak is visible but some distance away.

Mount Rungwe is the highest mountain in the wider Mbeya region and it dominates the skyline for several kilometers around. It is composed of ten or more dormant volcanic craters and domes. Rising above the small town of Tukuyu, at 2,960 metres or 9,711 feet, Rungwe is southern Tanzania's highest peak, and is among the highest in the country after some of the peaks in northern Tanzania such as Mount Kilimanjaro (5,895 metres or 19,341 feet) and Mount Meru (4,565 metres or 14,977 feet). Mount Rungwe is surrounded by a catchment forest reserve that was gazetted in 1949. This forest reserve incorporates montane forest, upper montane forest and montane grassland, with lesser amounts of bushland and heath at the upper elevations, found in low bushes along streams and at the edges of montane forest. The forest is home to a variety of significant forest flora and fauna, including the threatened Abbott's duiker. The forest is regarded as an important bird area, with two species listed as vulnerable. The most notable creatures are Rungwe bush vipers and Colobus monkeys.

Also ecologically important are the Poroto Mountains, south-east of Mbeya. In 2005, a completely new species of large monkey, the Kipunji, was discovered living in the southern highlands to the south-west of Mbeya. The Mbeya region has not yet been closely studied by scientists.

The Kitulo Plateau, famous for its orchids and display of native flora is now within the designated Kitulo National Park.

Forests in the area, even in the reserves, continue to be encroached upon and degraded. However, there has also been extensive tree and forest planting, which ensures the local firewood supply. There is a small illicit trade in orchid bulbs, which is thought to be endangering the survival of some species.

== Transport ==
=== Railway station ===
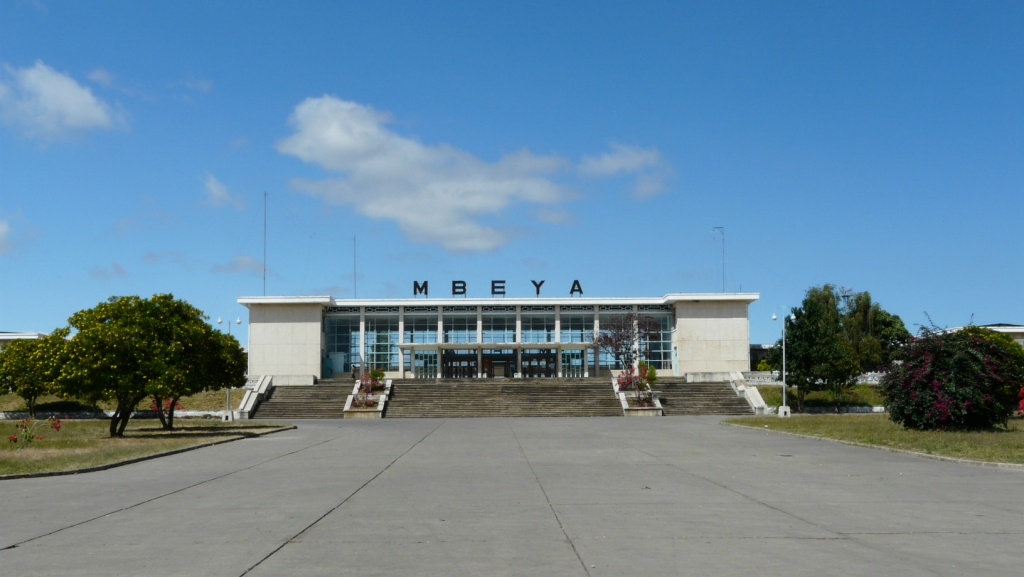
Mbeya Railway Station

Mbeya is served by the Mbeya Railway Station which is near the A104 or via the TAZARA railway line from the capital (approx. 600-miles, two overnight passenger trains per week).

=== Road links ===
Mbeya can be reached by road on the A-7 highway from Dar es Salaam. There are paved roads which connects Mbeya city with the other towns like Tukuyu through Uyole, Tunduma via TANZAM highway and Chunya to Tabora through Isanga.

=== Airport ===
Mbeya connects to the rest of Tanzania by air through Songwe International Airport which was opened in December 2012. It is one of four major airports available in Tanzania. Auric Air and Tropical Air fly from Songwe to Dar es Salaam. Songwe International Airport is within Mbeya region and not in the new Songwe region. The airport is about 25 kilometers from Mbeya City center and about 2-3 kilometers from Mbeya and Songwe regions boundary which is Songwe river.

== Tourism ==
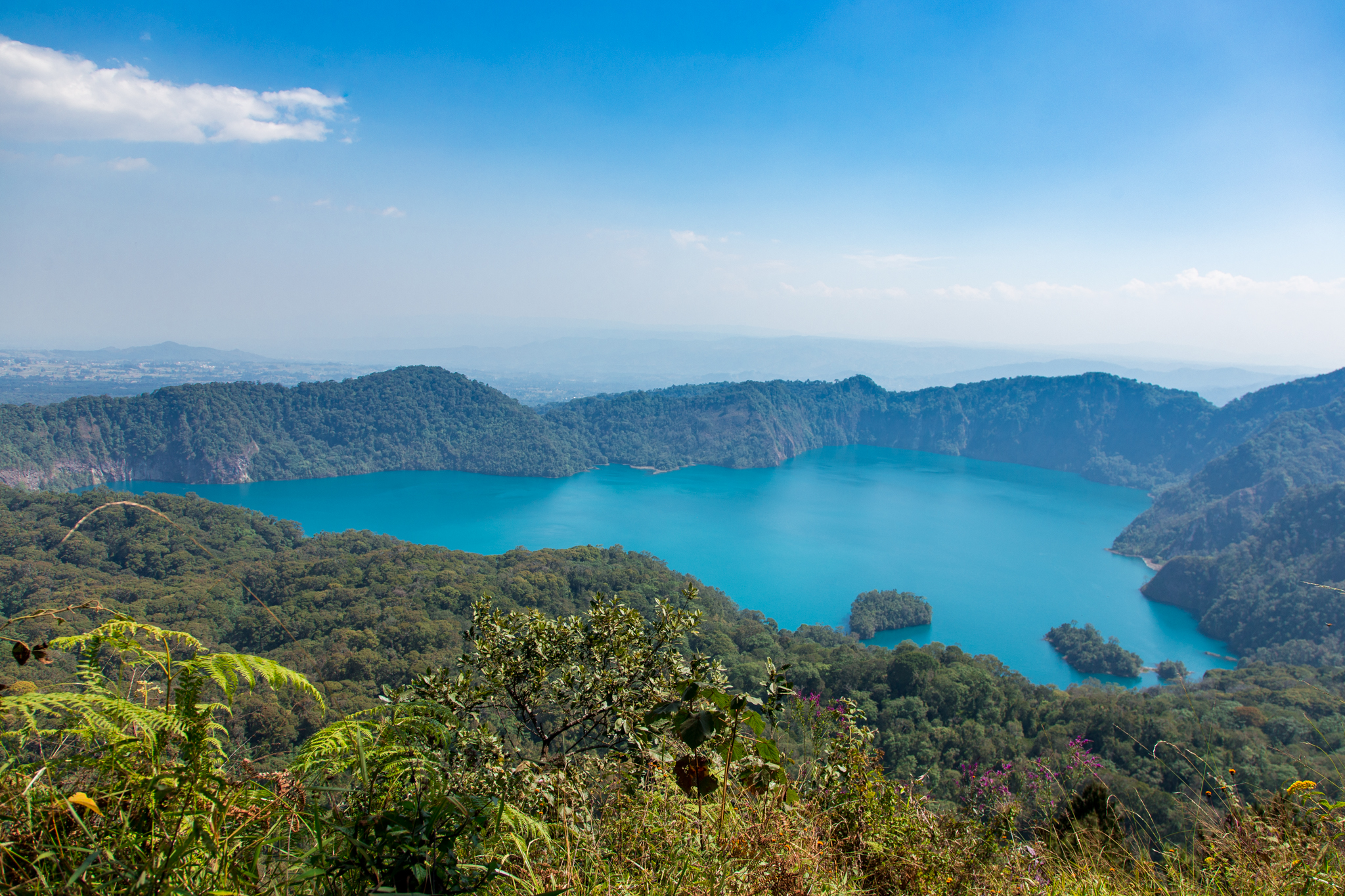
Lake Ngozi is the second largest crater lake in Africa. It can be found near Tukuyu, a small town in the highland Rungwe District, Mbeya Region.

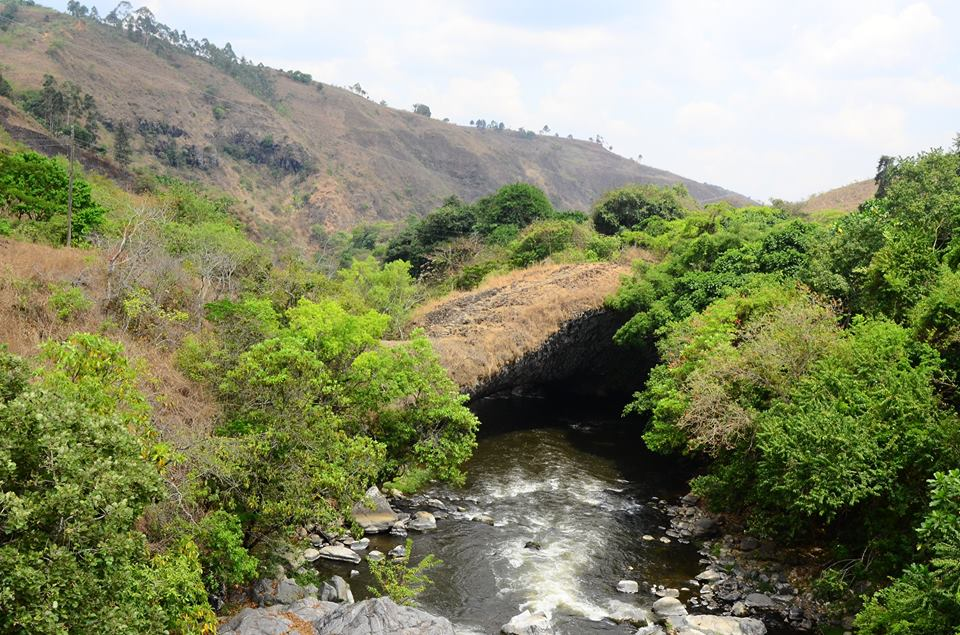
The Kiwira God's bridge

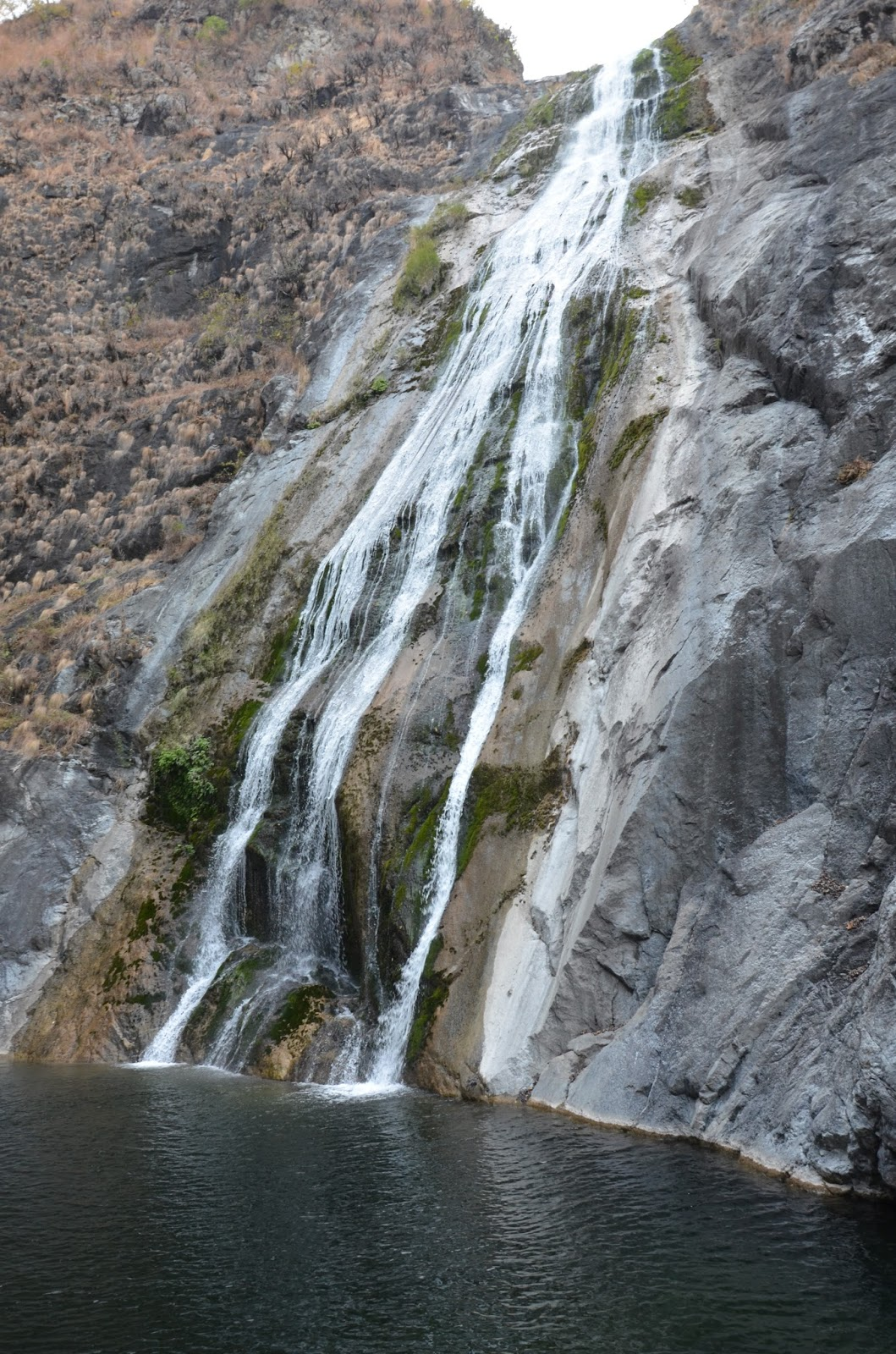
The Mwalalo water falls

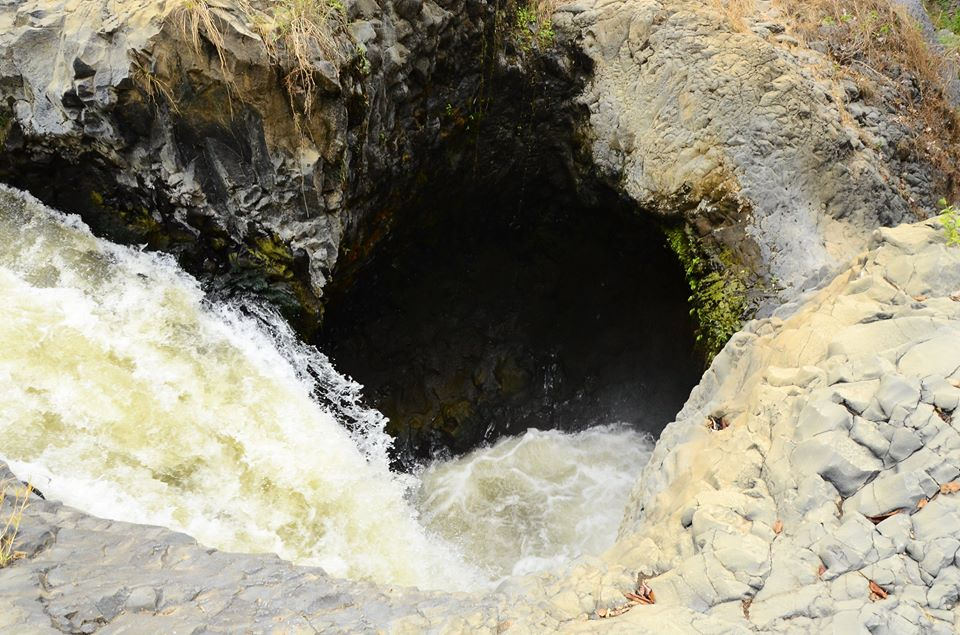
The cooking pot

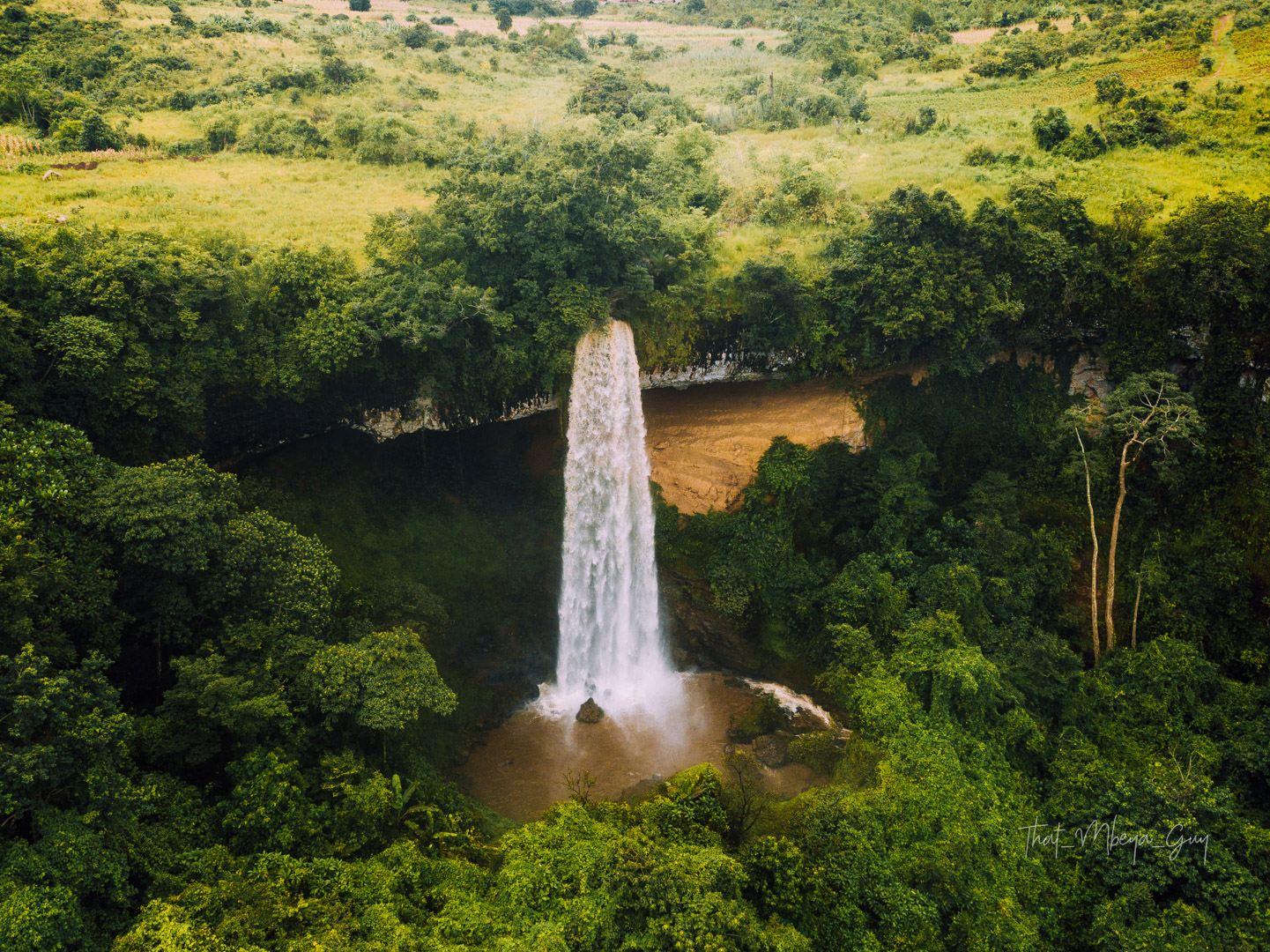
The Kapologwe Waterfall in Mbeya

The rains normally start in October and end around May, followed by a dry and cold spell between June and September. Conventional tourism is not a major contributor to the local economy and there are no months with peak tourism.

The city lies in the Rift Valley and is considered Csb by the Köppen-Geiger system. The cooler and mountainous climate in the town attracts mainly locals from other parts of the country and foreigners for the game watching and trout fishing. The local government has begun trying to widen tourism beyond animal and wild game viewing, and have invested in producing better mapping and developing a local tourist center.

Well-defined hiking trails have been established to enable hikers to reach the elevated areas and bio-diverse highlands, although the trails need to be properly mapped. For self-sufficient hikers, there are various routes in the Poroto Mountains around the small town of Tukuyu.

Some notable local tourist attractions in the area include:

- Kitulo National Park
- Ruaha National Park
- Lake Nyasa
- Mbosi meteorite
- Mwalalo Waterfalls
- The great rift valley viewing point
- Kisiba/Masoko crater lake

The city also has various rock and cave painting sites. Many of the rock sites have still been undocumented by the Antiequits department and provide a looking glass into the traditional cultures of the local surrounding communities.

The city also has a significant number of transit passengers heading towards Lusaka/Malawi from Dar es Salaam Port that often make a stop in the city for overnight lodging or food.

== Sports and culture ==
The city is represented in the Tanzanian Premier League by Mbeya City FC that is owned by Mbeya City Council and Prisons FC, owned by the Tanzanian Prisons Service based in Mbeya and they play their home matches at the Sokoine Stadium.

Ihefu is a club from Ubaruku, Mbarali district that was promoted to the Tanzanian premier league at the 2020–2021 season and currently play their home matches at the Highland Estate Stadium.

== Notable people ==
- Dr Tulia Ackson Mwansasu, former deputy attorney General, deputy speaker and current Speaker of the National Assembly
- Joseph Mbilinyi "Mr.II Sugu", former Member of Parliament for Mbeya Urban; artist and bongo flava genre pioneer
- Robert Mboma, retired CDF
- Fadhy Mtanga, author, poet, blogger, and photographer; lives in the city
- John Mwakangale, TANU leader and freedom fighter
- Godfrey Mwakikagile, Africanist and author
- Dr Harrison Mwakyembe, academic and former minister of sports
- Davis Mwamunyange, Chief of Defence Forces of the Tanzania People's Defence Force
- Professor Mark Mwandosya, academic and former minister of transport and communication; former MP for Rungwe East constituency now Busokelo
- Mary Machuche Mwanjelwa, special seat Member of Parliament since 2010
- Christopher Mwashinga, Tanzanian author and poet; originally from Igawilo, Mbeya; attended Igawilo Secondary School in the city of Mbeya for his O Levels; currently lives in the United States
- Rayvanny, musician from East Africa; born and raised in Nzovwe, Mbeya

== Twin towns – sister cities ==
- (Western Sahara) Tifariti, Sahrawi Arab Democratic Republic
