= State University of Zanzibar =

Coordinates: 6°9′57″S 39°11′30″E

- Chuo Kikuu cha Taifa cha Zanzibar (Swahili)
- Motto: Catalyst for social changes
- Type: Public
- Established: 1999; 27 years ago
- Affiliations: ACU
- Chancellor: Hussein Mwinyi
- Vice-Chancellor: Prof Moh'd Makame Haji
- Academic staff: 230
- Students: 7,000
- Location: Tunguu, Zanzibar South, Kusini Unguja, Zanzibar, Tanzania
- Campus: 9
- Website: www.suza.ac.tz

State University of Zanzibar (SUZA) is a public university located in Tunguu ward of Central District in South Region of Unguja Island in Zanzibar, Tanzania. The university was established by an act of House of Representatives of Zanzibar in 1999 and became operational in 2002.

== Faculties ==
Currently, the University consists of the School of Kiswahili and Foreign Languages (IKFL), School of Continuing and Professional Education (SCOPE), the School of Education (SE), School of Natural and Social Sciences (SNSS) and Computer Centre (CC). Additional institutes and schools will be established in the future as demanded by the Act and as the University grows.

The Institute of Kiswahili and Foreign Languages has been teaching Swahili, Arabic, English, Spanish, Portuguese, French and German with Education for a number of years at certificate and diploma levels. It has also been teaching Swahili to foreign students from different parts of the world. The Institute will continue to carry on with this work except that English is also taught in The School of Education, Arts and Sciences and Swahili will be taught to degree level.

The founding School of Education, Arts and Sciences provides courses leading to the degree of Bachelor of Arts with Education (B.A. Ed), Bachelor of Science with Education (B.Sc. Ed) and Bachelor of Science in Computer Sciences. These establishments will provide teachers who are badly needed for the development of the country.
