= Tanzania Commission for Universities =

Coordinates: 6.81703424°S 39.296887°E

- Established: 2005
- Location: Dar es Salaam, Tanzania
- Nickname: TCU
- Website: www.tcu.go.tz

Tanzania Commission for Universities (TCU) is the statutory and regulatory organization established in 2005 by the Tanzanian Government to oversee university education in Tanzania.

The TCU is the organization whose recognition, approval, and accredidation is needed before any university can be established.

== See also ==
- List of universities and colleges in Tanzania
- List of Tanzanian university chancellors and vice-chancellors
- Education in Africa
