= United African University of Tanzania =

The United African University of Tanzania
- Chuo Kikuu cha Umoja wa Afrika Tanzania (Swahili)
- Type: Private
- Established: 2012; 14 years ago
- Affiliations: CTSI COMPANY CO., LTD
- Chancellor: Kam, Kyungchul Ph.D.
- Vice-Chancellor: Prof. Kim, SUNGSOO Ph.D.
- Students: 124 (2024/25)
- Location: Vijibweni, Kigamboni, Dar es Salaam, Tanzania; 8°54′39″S 33°27′30″E
- Website: uaut.ac.tz

The United African University of Tanzania (UAUT) is a private Christian university located in Vijibweni ward of Kigamboni District in Dar es Salaam Region of Tanzania. It was founded by the Korea Church Mission and is located in Dar es Salaam.
