= Teofilo Kisanji University =

Coordinates: 8°54′39″S 33°27′30″E

- Chuo Kikuu cha Teofilo Kisanji (Swahili)
- Motto: Training for a better life
- Type: Private
- Established: 2007; 19 years ago
- Affiliations: Moravian Church
- Chairperson: Dr. Victoria Kanama
- Chancellor: Bishop Alinikisa Cheyo
- Vice-Chancellor: Prof. Tuli Kassimoto
- Students: 2,527 (2009/10)
- Location: Mbeya, Tanzania
- Website: University website

Teofilo Kisanji University (TEKU) is a private university in Mbeya, Tanzania. It is run by the Moravian Church of Tanzania.
