= Muslim University of Morogoro =

Islamic university in Morogoro, Tanzania

Coordinates: 6°48′4″S 37°39′32″E

- Chuo Kikuu cha Waislamu Morogoro (Swahili)
- Motto: Read in the Name of Allah
- Type: Private
- Established: 2004; 22 years ago
- Religious affiliation: Muslim Development Foundation
- Academic affiliations: AAU, ACU
- Chairperson: Abdulrahman Muhailani
- Chancellor: Abillah Omary
- Vice-Chancellor: Prof. Mussa Assad
- Location: Morogoro, Tanzania
- Campus: Urban
- Website: mum.ac.tz

Muslim University of Morogoro (MUM) is a private university in Morogoro, Tanzania, established to provide quality higher education within an Islamic framework. The university was founded in 2004 when President Benjamin Mkapa granted it to the Muslim Development Fund (MDF), an organization chaired by the late Kitwana Kondo, with board members including Ramadhani Dau and Abdulrahman Kinana, the former Vice Chairman of Tanzania’s ruling party. MUM officially began operations in 2005 and has since grown into a leading institution in the country.

The university is located in the Morogoro region, about 200 km (120 mi) from Dar es Salaam, at the surface level of the Uluguru Mountains, near Msamvu Bus Terminal. It is accredited by the Tanzania Commission for Universities (TCU) and the National Council for Technical Education (NACTE) and offers postgraduate, undergraduate, diploma, and certificate programs across its five faculties: Law and Sharia, Arts and Humanities, Business Studies, Science, and Islamic Studies. MUM has a staff of more than 160, comprising both academic and administrative personnel.

== Academic Programmes ==
MUM offers a wide range of 'degree and non-degree programmes at the postgraduate, undergraduate, diploma, and certificate levels:

=== Postgraduate Programmes ===
- Master of Arts with Education (MAED) – 18 months
- Master of Arts in Kiswahili (MA Kiswahili) – 18 months

=== Undergraduate Programmes ===
- Bachelor of Arts with Education (BAED) – 3 years
- Bachelor of Business Studies (BBS) – 3 years
- Bachelor of Islamic Studies with Education (BIED) – 3 years
- Bachelor of Laws with Sharia’h (LLBS) – 4 years
- Bachelor of Arts (Mass Communication) – 3 years
- Bachelor of Science (Education) – 3 years
- Bachelor of Arts in Geography and Population Studies (BAGPS) – 3 years
- Bachelor of Arts in Kiswahili (BAK) – 3 years
- Bachelor of Business Administration (BBA) – 3 years
- Bachelor of Arts in Literature and Language Studies (BALLS) – 3 years

=== Diploma Programmes (2–3 years) ===
- Journalism
- Science and Laboratory Technology
- Medical Laboratory Sciences
- Medical Laboratory Sciences (Upgrading – 1 year)
- Procurement and Logistics Management
- Islamic Banking and Finance
- Law and Shariah
- Accountancy
- Business Administration

=== Certificate Programmes (1 year) ===
- Journalism
- Science and Laboratory Technology
- Procurement and Logistics Management
- Islamic Banking and Finance
- Business Administration
- Accountancy
- Law and Shariah

== Non-Academic Programs ==
In addition to its academic offerings, the Muslim University of Morogoro provides non-academic programs aimed at broadening cultural knowledge and skillsets. One such program is Chinese language classes, offered in collaboration with the Confucius Institute.

== Facilities and Campus Life ==
The 18-hectare campus is surrounded by a wall. The university also has a large mosque with a capacity of 2,000 worshipers and hostels for female students.

== Alumni ==
Since its inception, the Muslim University of Morogoro has produced over 10,000 graduates. Alumni include:

- Ahmed Ally (Simba Spokesperson)
- Dr. Mussa O. Amanzi
- Miraji Chomoka
- Dr. Rashid Mohamed Chuachua (DC. Kigoma)
- Dr. Salum Haji
- Jaafar Haniu (TBC)
- Dr. Said N.Jaff
- Waziri Salum Kingo (President's Secretary)
- Salum Khalfani Mtelela (DAS. Bunda District)
- Prof. Athuman Ponera (UDOM)
- Dr. Ahmed Sovu

, among others.
