= Ruaha Catholic University =

- Type: Private
- Location: Iringa, Tanzania; 7.7760°S 35.6963°E
- Website: rucu.ac.tz

Ruaha Catholic University (RUCU) is a private university in Tanzania. It is located in Iringa, Tanzania. It was started by the Tanzania Episcopal Conference.
