= Zanzibar University =

Private university in Tanzania

Coordinates: 6.2253°S 39.3125°E

- جامعة زنجبار (Arabic); Chuo Kikuu cha Zanzibar (Swahili)
- Motto: Chemchemi ya Maarifa (Swahili)
- Motto in English: Spring of Knowledge and Virtue
- Type: Private
- Established: 1998; 28 years ago
- Religious affiliation: Darul Iman Charitable Association
- Academic affiliations: AAU, ACU
- Chancellor: Eng. Dr. Abdulkadir Hafiz
- Vice-Chancellor: Prof. Mohammed Awadelkarim Elhussein
- Location: Zanzibar, Tanzania
- Website: www.zanvarsity.ac.tz

Zanzibar University is a private university in Zanzibar, Tanzania. It opened in 1998 as the first university in Zanzibar. It is a private university sponsored by the Darul Iman Charitable Association, an Islamic religious organization in Ontario, Canada. The university is situated in Tunguu area, in the Central District, some 12 miles (19 km) from Zanzibar Town. The university campus, with a total area of 170 acres (0.69 km^{2}), is located among quiet countryside surroundings overlooking the Indian Ocean. There is public transport to the university.

== Historical background ==
In 1994 Aboud Jumbe Mwinyi, a former President of Zanzibar, persuaded The Darul Iman Charitable Association (NGO) representatives, who were stationed in Dar es Salaam, to build a technical college in Zanzibar. The request was accepted; construction began in 1994 and was completed in 1997.

The objective of establishing a technical college was superseded by the objective of establishing a university, on the request of Zanzibar President Salmin Amour Juma, when construction was completed in 1997. The Darul Iman Charitable Association accepted the Zanzibar government request, and Zanzibar University was officially opened in April 1998. Prof. Shamseldin Z. Abdin (Sudanese national) was the first vice-chancellor for the university. He began his tenure with the opening of the university and stayed on until the first class graduated in 2002.

== Future programmes ==
The Zanzibar University was planned to begin modestly with the Faculty of Business Administration. The proliferation of business enterprises and hotel resorts and the gradual expansion of the tourism industry in the country convinced the Darul Iman sponsors to begin with the Faculty of Business Administration, with the view of satisfying the immediate needs of the business community. In 1999 the Faculty of Law and Shariah was established, and in 2002 a Faculty of Arts and Social Science was established. Within the next seven or so years more structures will be erected to accommodate additional faculties, namely: Faculty of Science, Faculty of Engineering and Faculty of Health Sciences. All the faculties will in soon offer bachelor, master's and doctorate degrees.

== Accreditation ==
Zanzibar University received a Certificate of Provision Registration in 1999 and a Certificate of Full Registration on 4 May 2000.

In cooperation with the Euro-African Management Research Centre (E-AMARC) based in Maastricht, The Netherlands, Zanzibar University has established a centre for Small Business Development.

== See also ==
- Education in Tanzania
