= Sebastian Kolowa Memorial University =

Private university in Tanzania

Coordinates: 4°45′5″S 38°17′51″E

- Chuo Kikuu cha Kumbukumbu cha Sebastian Kolowa (Swahili)
- Former name: Sebastian Kolowa University College
- Type: Private
- Established: 2012; 14 years ago
- Affiliations: Evangelical Lutheran Church in Tanzania
- Chairman: Prof. Maurice Mbago
- Chancellor: Rt. Rev. Stephen Munga
- Vice-Chancellor: Prof. Didas Kimaro
- Location: Lushoto, Tanzania
- Website: sekomu.ac.tz

Sebastian Kolowa Memorial University (SEKOMU) is a private university in Lushoto, Tanzania. It has three faculties: Education, Science, and Law.

Besides the teaching at the main campus, the university provides courses at Tanga Training Center (TC) and Bumbuli Clinical Officer Training Center (COTC).
