= International Medical and Technological University =

Private university in Tanzania

Coordinates: 6°42′44″S 39°12′35″E

- Chuo Kikuu cha Kimataifa cha Matibabu na Teknolojia (Swahili)
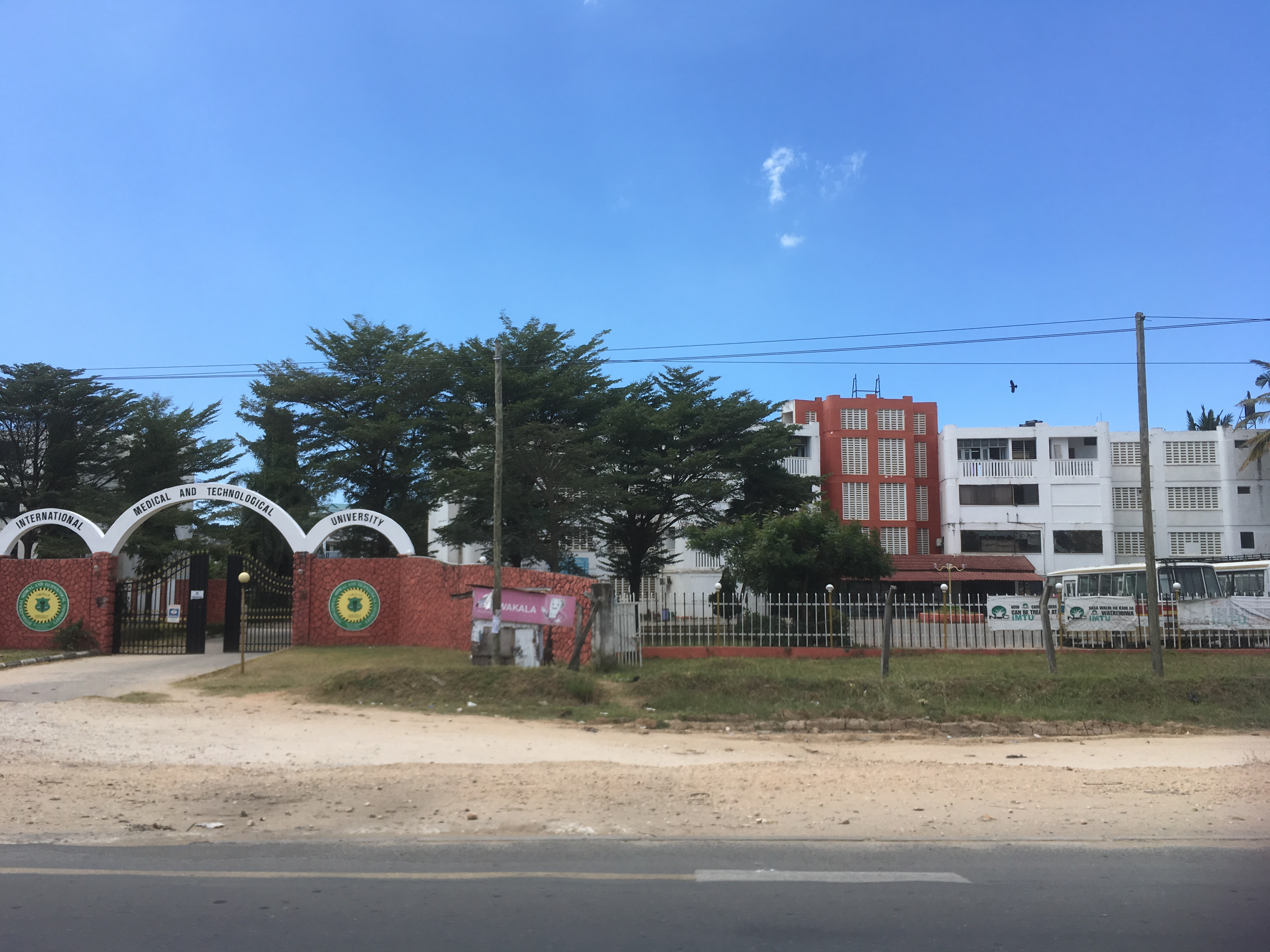
- Motto: Commitment to Excellence
- Type: Private
- Established: 1997; 29 years ago
- Chancellor: Amb. O.P. Gupta
- Vice-Chancellor: Prof. Ashok Babu, Mandali
- Location: New Bagamoyo Road, Dar es Salaam, Tanzania
- Campus: Urban
- Website: University website

The International Medical and Technological University (IMTU) is a private university located in Kawe ward of Kinondoni District in Dar es Salaam Region, Tanzania.

== Establishment ==
The owner of the university is Shri. Katuri Subba Rao, the founder and Chairman of the Vignan Educational Foundation (VEF). The VEF of Bangalore, India initiated establishment of the university in Tanzania at the behest of Julius Nyerere, the father of the Tanzania nation.

The seeds of the venture were sown by Benjamin Mkapa, the third president of Tanzania when he was the Minister for Science, Technology and Higher Education, with the support of Jakaya M. Kikwete, the fourth president of Tanzania when he was the Minister for Foreign Affairs and International Cooperation. The establishment of the university symbolizes the long-standing partnership between Tanzania and India as part implementation of the South–South cooperation.

The university commenced by establishing the College of Medicine which was inaugurated on 17 September 1997 by the prime minister of India, shri.I.K. Gujral.

== Enrollment ==
The university started small with five students, all from India. It has since grown, after having been granted Certificate of Full Registration No. 009 on 20 December 2001, by the Higher Education Accreditation Council (HEAC). The number of students has grown to more than 1,000 drawn from around the world. The enrollment was very competitive on its own for undergraduates the enrollment is through a centralized system (CAS) which is governed by Tanzania Commission for University (TCU). The admission for Masters and PhD is usually done and processed within the University based on the criteria set by the University. IMTU was among the leading top University in Tanzanian and ensures quality education by abiding to all rules and regulations set by TCU.

== Organizational structure ==
Like any other private university in Tanzania, IMTU is governed by a Board of Trustees (constituted by the Vignan Educational Foundation of India, the owner and founder) and has a Council and a Senate. It has a School of Medicine (running the MBBS Programme) and a prospective School of Nursing (running degree and diploma programmes). It will establish a directorate of postgraduate programmes as well as an Institute of Allied Health (and Technological) Sciences in its five-year strategic plan.

The university has a chancellor, a council chairman (who is a trustee), and a vice chancellor (who is the chief executive officer). There are two deputy vice chancellors (for academics and administration), as well as a dean (Faculty of Medicine), and heads of departments.

In accordance with TCU directives, IMTU is in the process of re-organizing its organizational and functional structures to comply with the provisions of the Tanzania Universities Act of 2005, including having a new charter.

IMTU has a hospital which is managed by a director.

== Principal officers ==
- Chancellor: Amb. O.P. Gupta
- Council Chairman and Trustee: Katuri Subba Rao
- Vice Chancellor: Prof. Ashok Babu Mandali, MBBS, MD
- Deputy Vice Chancellor – Academics: Prof. Kagoma S. Mnyika, PhD
- Deputy Vice Chancellor – Prof. Felix Kisanga, PhD
- Dean, Faculty of Medicine: Dr. Luke J. Siyame, MD, M.Med, MPH

=== University Council ===
1. Mr. Katuri Subba Rao 2. Ambassador O.P. Gupta 3. High Commissioner of India 4. Dr. Khadija Malima, COSTECH 5. Prof. Yunus Mgaya, NIMR 6. Hon. Mrs. Rita Mlaki 7. Ambassador Eva Nzaro 8. Dr. Veronica Nyahende, HESLB 9. Ambassador Y.C. Lumbanga 10. Director of Higher Education 11. Dr. Otilia F Gowelle, Ministry of Health 12. Mr. Rupen Chande 13. Mr. Naidu Katuri 14. Dr. Shaik Moulali 15. IMTUSO Representative 16. IMTUSO Representative
