= University of Bagamoyo =

Coordinates: 6°45′21″S 39°14′43″E

- Chuo Kikuu cha Bagamoyo (Swahili)
- Motto: Leadership and Service
- Type: Private
- Established: 2010; 16 years ago
- Chairman: Prof. Josaphat Kanywanyi
- Chancellor: Rt. Rev. Elinaza Sendoro
- Vice-Chancellor: Prof. Costa Mahalu
- Location: Dar es Salaam, Tanzania
- Campus: Urban
- Website: University Website

University of Bagamoyo (UB) is a private university in Tanzania. It was started by the Tanzania Legal Education Trust (TANLET) and The Legal and Human Rights Centre (LHRC). It is located in Dar es Salaam with its main campus being built in Kiromo, Bagamoyo.
