= Mbagala =

Ward of Temeke District, Dar es Salaam Region

Mbagala Kata ya Mbagala (Swahili)
- Ward of Temeke District
- From top to bottom
- Interactive map of Mbagala
- Coordinates: 6°53′59.64″S 39°15′57.6″E
- Country: Tanzania
- Region: Dar es Salaam Region
- District: Temeke District

Area
  - Total: 3.3 km^{2} (1.3 sq mi)

Population (2012)
  - Total: 53,291

Ethnic groups
  - Settler: Swahili
  - Ancestral: Zaramo
- Tanzanian Postal Code: 15114

Mbagala (Kata ya Mbagala , in Swahili) is an administrative ward in the Temeke district of the Dar es Salaam Region of Tanzania. Buza and Azimio wards border the ward to the north. The ward is bordered by Kijichi and Mbagala Kuu to the east and Charambe to the south. Last but not least, Kiburugwa borders the ward on the west. Mbagala is also the site of an army base, which was hit by a deadly ammunition dump explosion on April 29, 2009. According to the 2012 census, the ward has a total population of 52,582.

== Administration ==
The postal code for Mbagala Ward is 15114. The ward is divided into the following neighborhoods (Mitaa):

- Bughudadi
- Kizinga
- Mangaya

- Mbagala
- Moringe
- Serenge

=== Government ===
Like every other ward in the country, the ward has local government offices based on the population served. The Mbagala Ward administration building houses a court as per the Ward Tribunal Act of 1988, including other vital departments for the administration of the ward. The ward has the following administration offices:

- Mbagala Police Station (Kituo cha Polisi)
- Mbagala Government Office ( Ofisi ya Afisa Mtendaji wa Kata)
- Mbagala Tribunal (Baraza La Kata) is a Department inside Ward Government Office

In the local government system of Tanzania, the ward is the smallest democratic unit. Each ward comprises a committee of eight elected council members, including a chairperson, one salaried officer (with no voting rights), and an executive officer. One-third of seats are reserved for women councilors.

== Demographics ==
The ward serves as the Zaramo people's ancestral home, along with much of the district. As the city developed over time, the ward became a cosmopolitan ward with a population of 52,582 as of 2012.

== Education and health ==
=== Education ===
The ward is home to these educational institutions:

- Mbagala Primary School
- Annex Primary School
- Great Vision Primary School
- Mbagala Islamic Primary School

=== Healthcare ===
The ward is home to the following health institutions:

- Mbagala Kizuiani Health Center
