= Kibada =

Ward of the Kigamboni District in the Dar es Salaam Region of Tanzania

Kibada Kata ya Kibada (Swahili)
- Ward of Kigamboni District
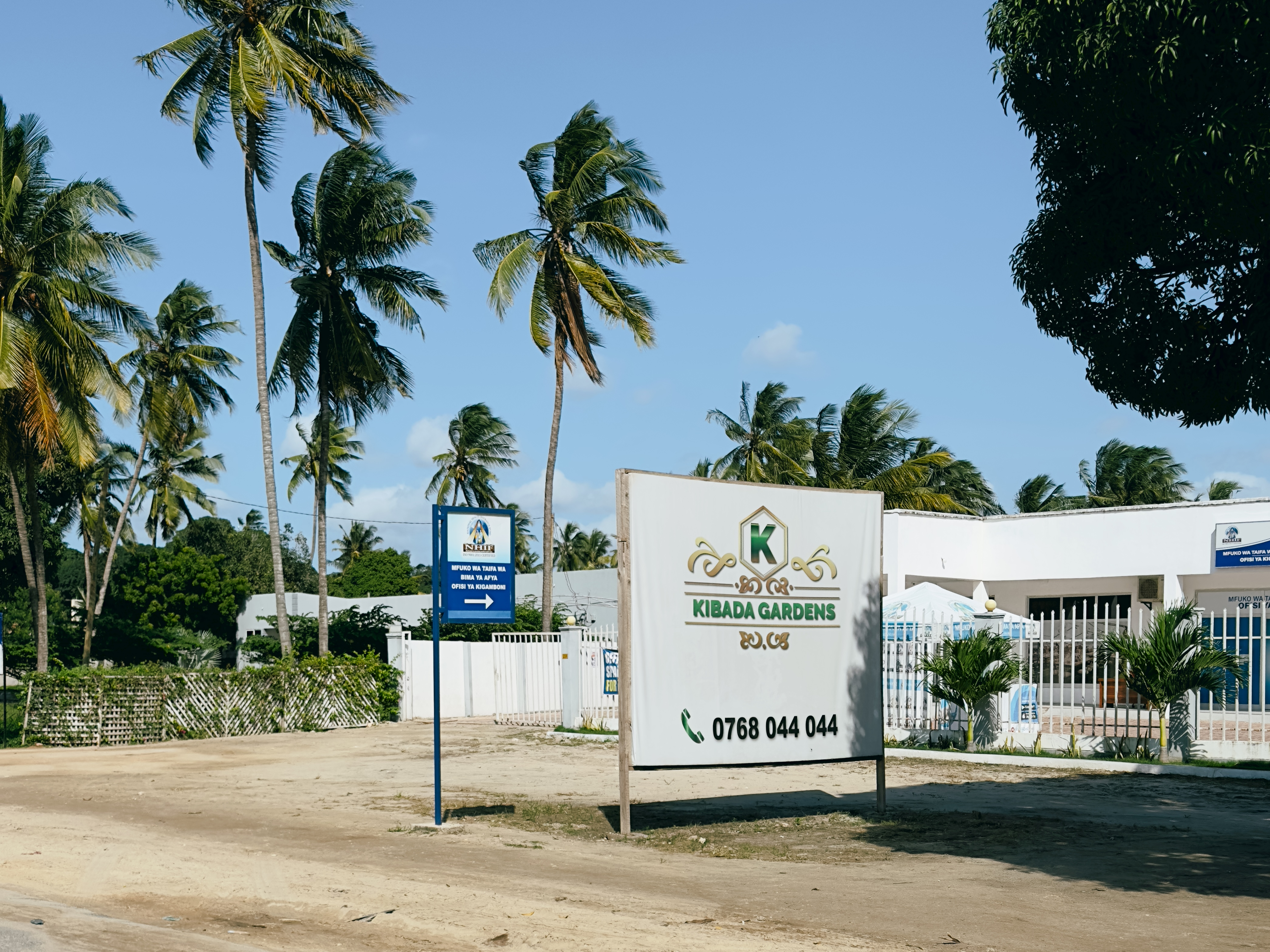
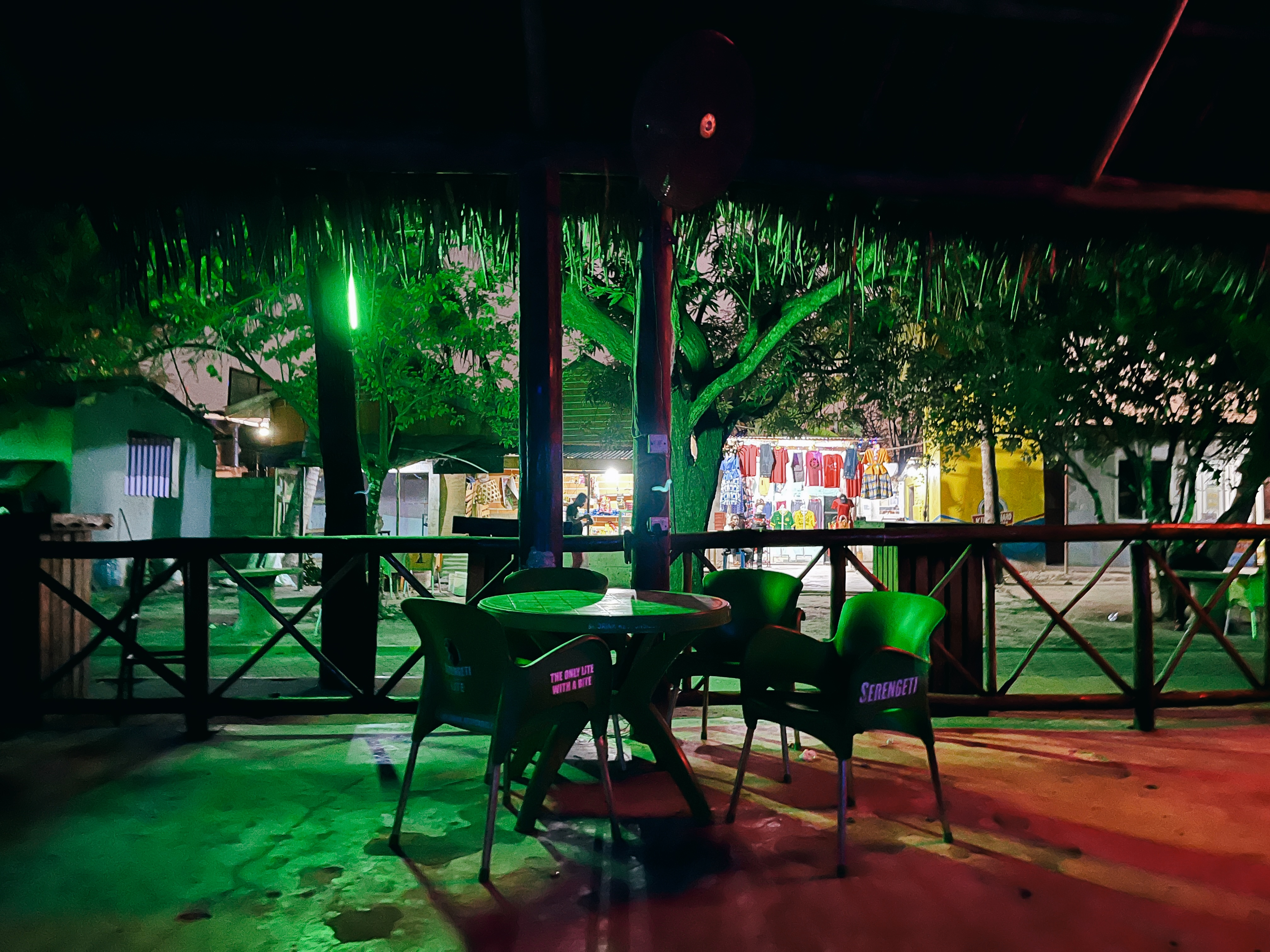
- From top to bottom: Store in Kibada & Restaurant in Kibada ward
- Nickname: The mango capital of Dar es Salaam
- Interactive map of Kibada
- Coordinates: 6°48′3.27″S 39°15′6.9″E
- Country: Tanzania
- Region: Dar es Salaam Region
- District: Kigamboni District

Area
  - Total: 16.6 km^{2} (6.4 sq mi)

Population (2012)
  - Total: 8,585

Ethnic groups
  - Settler: Swahili
  - Ancestral: Zaramo
- Tanzanian Postal Code: 17109

Kibada (Kata ya Kibada, in Swahili) is an administrative ward in the Kigamboni district of the Dar es Salaam Region of Tanzania. The Temeke District's Kijichi and Toangoma wards border the ward on the south and west, and Mjimwema and Kisarawe II wards border it on the east. The ward is bordered to the north by Vijibweni. The ward is famous for its mango production.

In 2016 the Tanzania National Bureau of Statistics report there were 10,750 people in the ward, from 8,585 in 2012.

== Administration ==
The postal code for Kibada Ward is 17109. The ward is divided into the following neighborhoods (Mitaa)/Villages (Vitongoji):

- Kichangani
- Kifurukwe
- Kiziza

- Nyakwale
- Sokoni
- Uvumba

=== Government ===
The ward, like every other ward in the country, has local government offices based on the population served.The Kibada Ward administration building houses a court as per the Ward Tribunal Act of 1988, including other vital departments for the administration the ward. The ward has the following administration offices:

- Kibada Ward Police Station
- Kibada Ward Government Office (Afisa Mtendaji)
- Kibada Ward Tribunal (Baraza La Kata) is a Department inside Ward Government Office

In the local government system of Tanzania, the ward is the smallest democratic unit. Each ward is composed of a committee of eight elected council members which include a chairperson, one salaried officer (with no voting rights), and an executive officer. One-third of seats are reserved for women councillors.

== Demographics ==
Like much of the district, the ward is the ancestral home of the Zaramo people. The ward evolved into a cosmopolitan ward as the city progressed over time. 8,585 people lived in the ward as a whole in 2012.

== Education and health ==
=== Education ===
The ward is home to these educational institutions:

- Ungindoni Primary School
- Kibada Primary School
- St.Joseph Primary School, Kibada
- Grace Primary School, Kibada
- Kibada Secondary School
- Mzimbini Secondary School
- Mikwambe Secondary School

=== Healthcare ===
The ward is home to the following health institutions:

- Tumaini Mission Health Center
- Kibada Hospital
- Kibada Faith Health Center
- PCMC Health Center
