= Abdallah Mtolea =

Tanzanian politician (born 1976)

Honourable Abdallah Ally Mtolea MP

Member of Parliament for Temeke
- Incumbent
- Assumed office December 2015

Personal details
- Born: 3 June 1976 (age 50)
- Party: CUF

Abdallah Ally Mtolea (born June 3, 1976) is a Tanzanian politician and a member of the CUF political party. He was elected MP of Temeke District in 2015.
