= Mbagala Kuu =

Ward of Temeke District, Dar es Salaam Region

Mbagala Kuu Kata ya Mbagala Kuu (Swahili)
- Ward of Temeke District
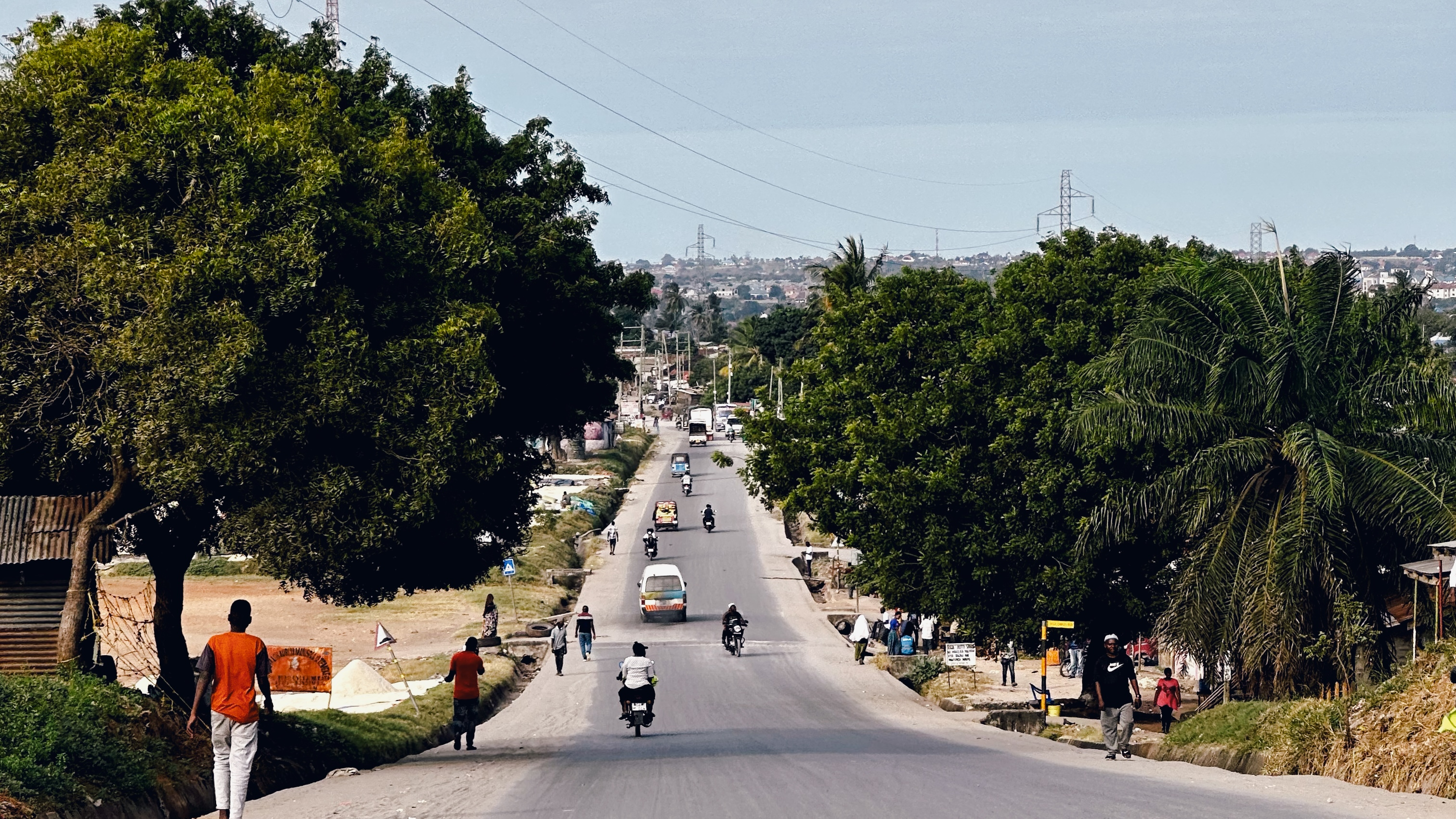
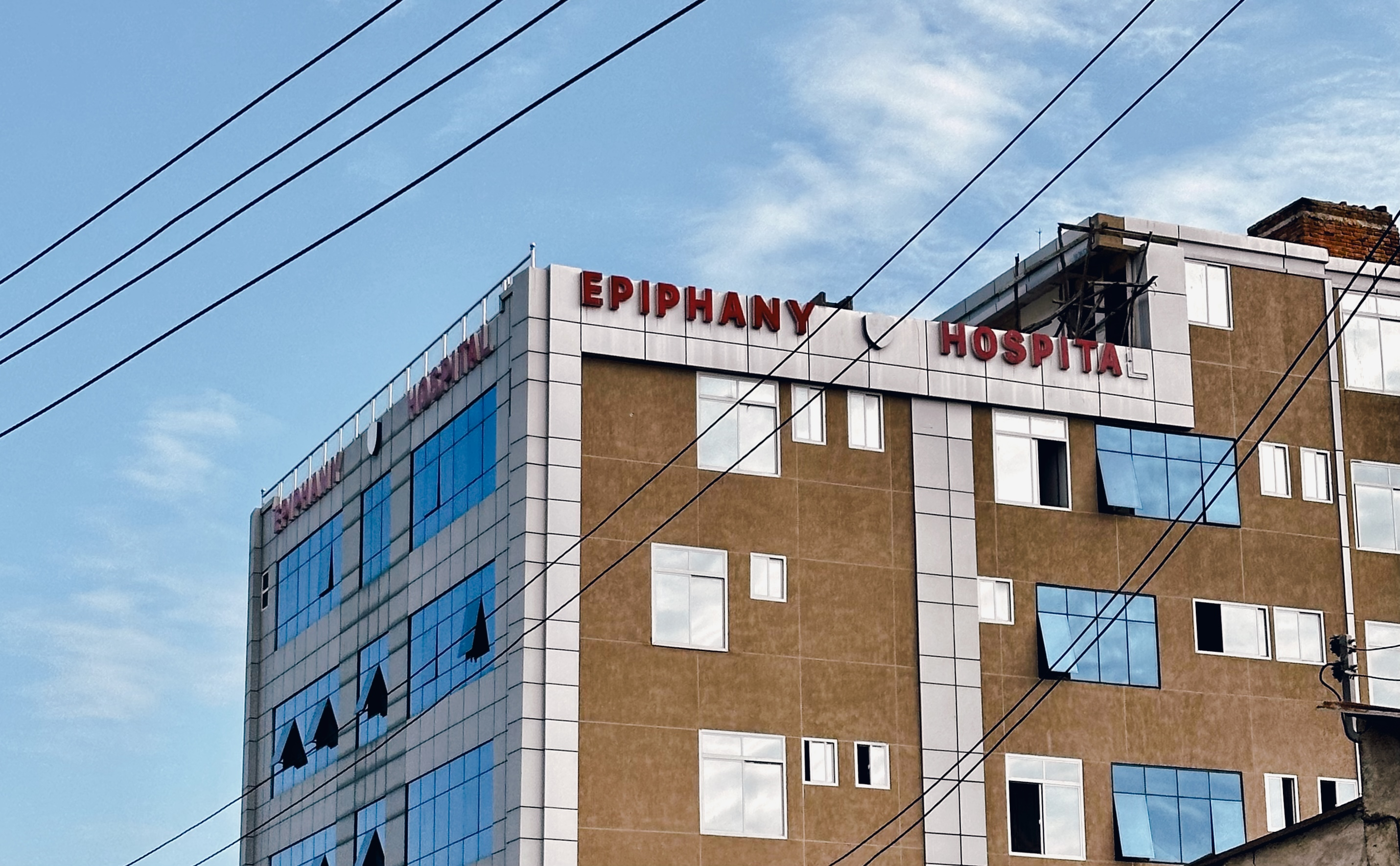
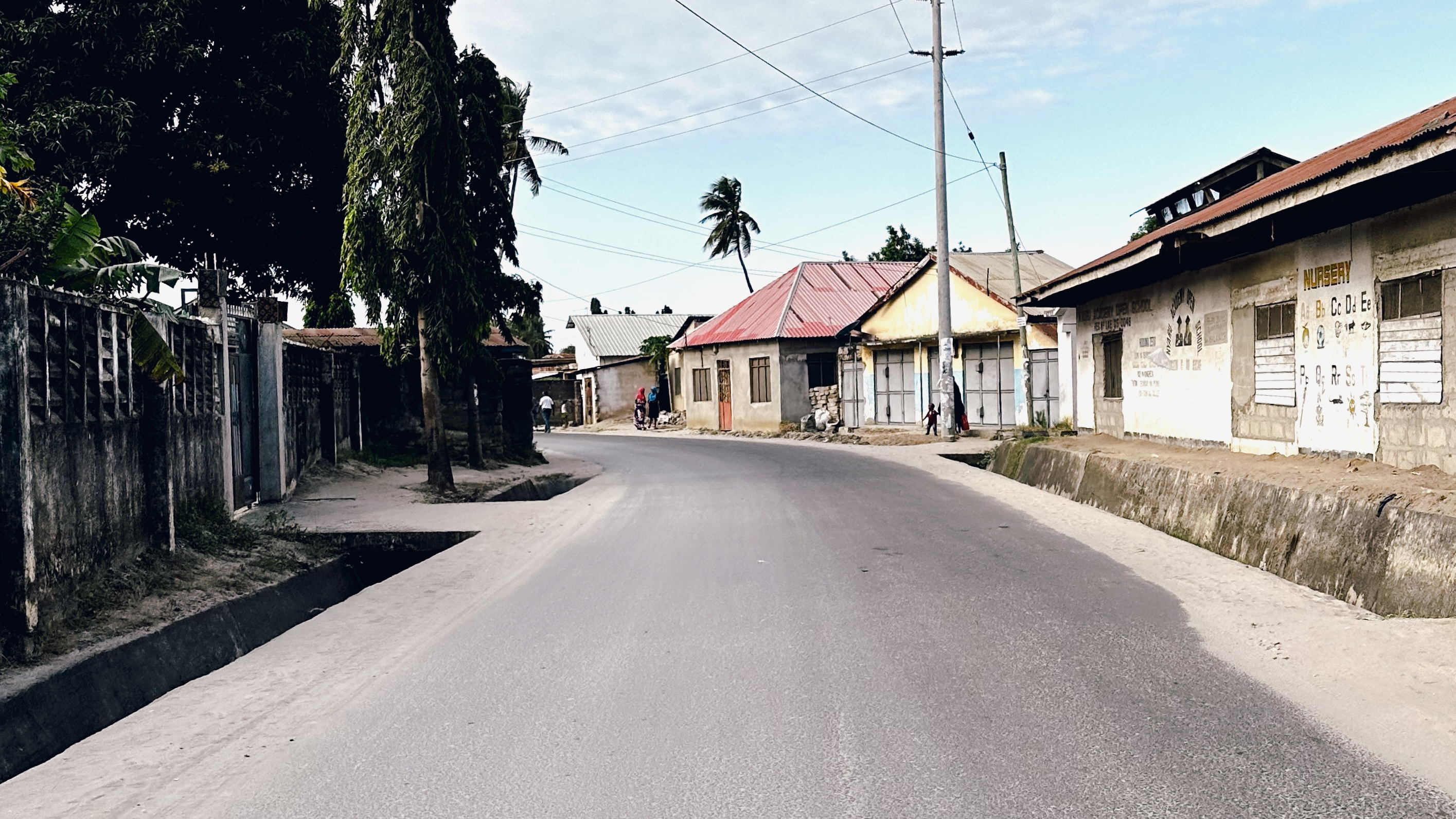
- From top to bottom: Road dividing Mbagala Kuu ward and Mianzini ward, Temeke MC, Dar es Salaam, hospital in Mbagala Kuu and street scene in Mbagala Kuu
- Interactive map of Mbagala Kuu
- Coordinates: 6°54′47.16″S 39°17′6.72″E
- Country: Tanzania
- Region: Dar es Salaam Region
- District: Temeke District

Area
  - Total: 6.5 km^{2} (2.5 sq mi)

Population (2012)
  - Total: 74,774

Ethnic groups
  - Settler: Swahili
  - Ancestral: Zaramo
- Tanzanian Postal Code: 15112

Mbagala Kuu (Kata ya Mbagala Kuu , in Swahili) is an administrative ward in the Temeke district of the Dar es Salaam Region of Tanzania. Kijichi borders the ward on its northern side. The ward is bordered by Toangoma to the east and Mianzini to the south. Last but not least, Mbagala and Charambe border the ward to the west. According to the 2012 census, the ward has a total population of 74,774.

== Administration ==
The postal code for Mbagala Kuu Ward is 15112. The ward is divided into the following neighborhoods (Mitaa):

- Jeshi la Wokovu
- Kibonde Maji "B"
- Kichemchem
- Kizuiani, Mbagala Kuu
- Makuka Kaskazini

- Makuka Kusini
- Mbagala Kuu Kaskazini
- Mbagala Kuu Magharibi
- Mbagala Kuu Mashariki
- Mpakani

=== Government ===
Like every other ward in the country, the ward has local government offices based on the population served. The Mbagala Kuu Ward administration building houses a court as per the Ward Tribunal Act of 1988, including other vital departments for the administration of the ward. The ward has the following administration offices:

- Mbagala Kuu Police Station (Kituo cha Polisi)
- Mbagala Kuu Government Office ( Ofisi ya Afisa Mtendaji wa Kata)
- Mbagala Kuu Tribunal (Baraza La Kata) is a Department inside Ward Government Office

In the local government system of Tanzania, the ward is the smallest democratic unit. Each ward comprises a committee of eight elected council members, including a chairperson, one salaried officer (with no voting rights), and an executive officer. One-third of seats are reserved for women councilors.

== Demographics ==
The ward serves as the Zaramo people's ancestral home, along with much of the district. As the city developed over time, the ward became a cosmopolitan ward with a population of 74,774 as of 2012.

== Education and health ==
=== Education ===
The ward is home to these educational institutions:

- Maendeleo Primary School
- St. Anthony Secondary School, Mbagala Kuu
- Mbagala Kuu Primary School
- Lasana Primary School
- Mbagala Kuu Secondary School
- Balili Secondary School

=== Healthcare ===
The ward is home to the following health institutions:

- Mbagala Kuu Dispensary
- Mbagala Mission Health Center
- Kibondemaji Health Centre
- Kichemchem Health Center
