= Mianzini =

Ward of Temeke District, Dar es Salaam Region

Mianzini Kata ya Mianzini (Swahili)
- Ward of Temeke District
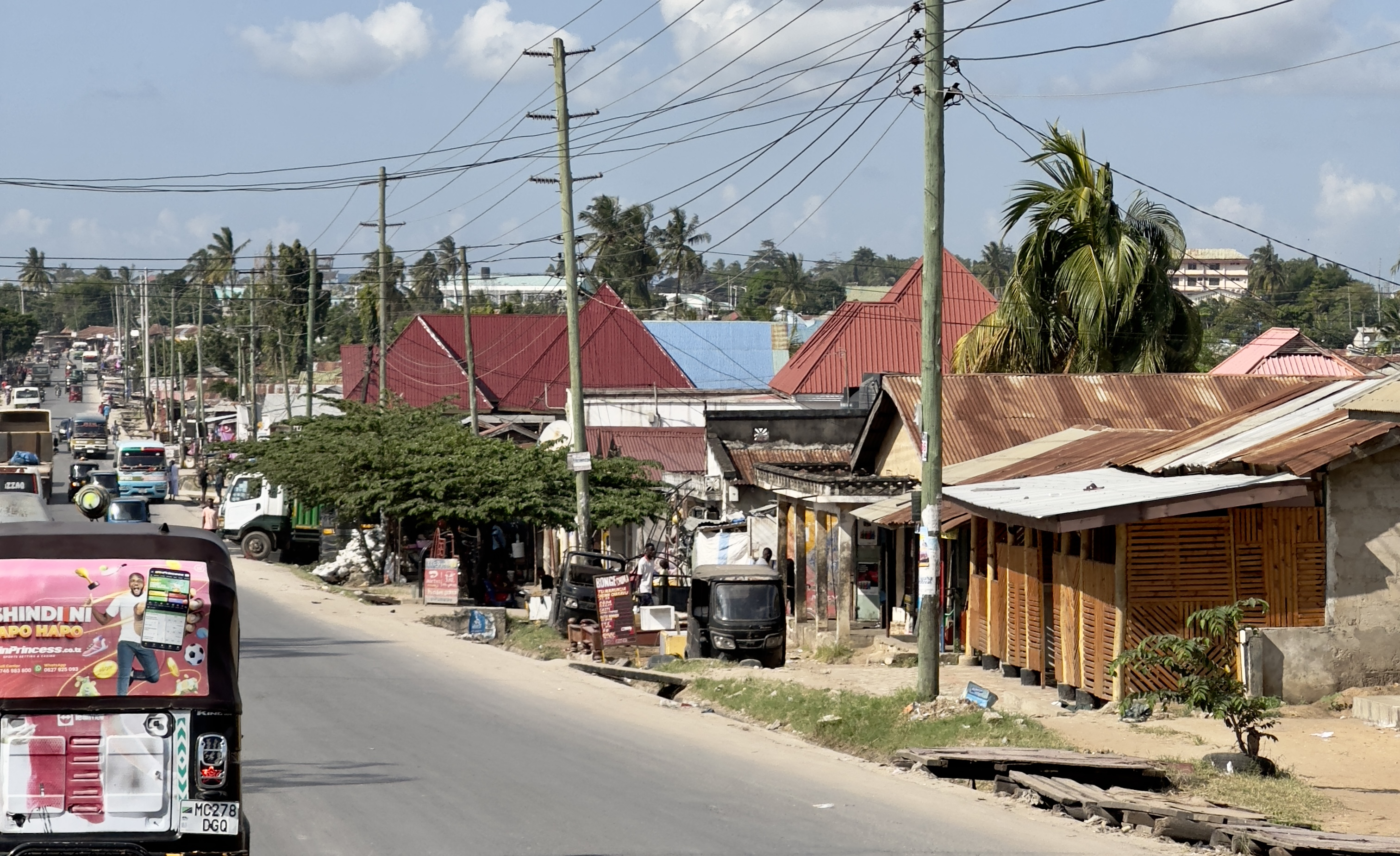
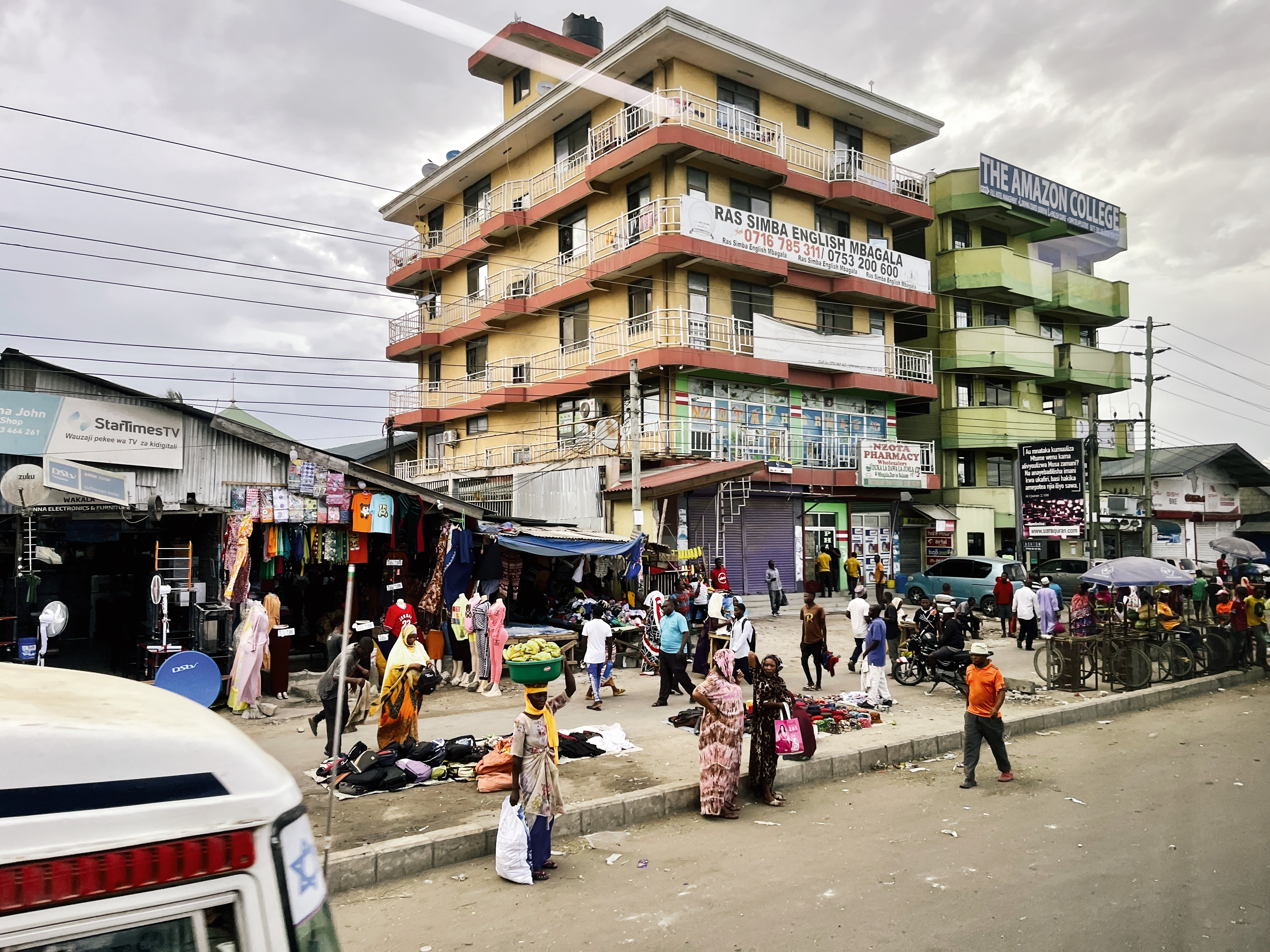
- From top to bottom: Houses in Mianzini ward & High density housing in Miazini ward
- Interactive map of Mianzini
- Coordinates: 6°56′20.4″S 39°15′58.68″E
- Country: Tanzania
- Region: Dar es Salaam Region
- District: Temeke District

Area
  - Total: 9.4 km^{2} (3.6 sq mi)

Population (2012)
  - Total: 100,649

Ethnic groups
  - Settler: Swahili
  - Ancestral: Zaramo
- Tanzanian Postal Code: 15129

Mianzini (Kata ya Mianzini, in Swahili) is an administrative ward in the Temeke district of the Dar es Salaam Region of Tanzania. The ward is bordered to the east by Mbagala Kuu and Toangoma wards. Mianzini is bordered to the south by Tambani ward of Mkuranga District in Pwani Region. To the west the ward is bordered by Chamazi and lastly to the north the ward is bordred by Charambe ward. According to the 2012 census, the ward has a total population of 100,649.

== Administration ==
The postal code for Mianzini Ward is 15130. The ward is divided into the following neighborhoods (Mitaa):

- Machinjoni
- Majimatitu A
- Mianzini, Mianzini

- Mponda

=== Government ===
Like every other ward in the country, the ward has local government offices based on the population served. The Mianzini Ward administration building houses a court as per the Ward Tribunal Act of 1988, including other vital departments for the administration of the ward. The ward has the following administration offices:

- Mianzini Ward Police Station
- Mianzini Ward Government Office (Afisa Mtendaji)
- Mianzini Ward Tribunal (Baraza La Kata) is a Department inside Ward Government Office

In the local government system of Tanzania, the ward is the smallest democratic unit. Each ward comprises a committee of eight elected council members, including a chairperson, one salaried officer (with no voting rights), and an executive officer. One-third of seats are reserved for women councilors.

== Demographics ==
The ward serves as the Zaramo ancestral home along with a sizable chunk of the district. The ward changed over time as the city grew, becoming a cosmopolitan ward.

== Education and health ==
=== Education ===
The ward is home to these educational institutions:

- Mbagala Islamic Primary School
- Mwangaza English Medium Primary School
- Faraja Primary School
- Majimatitu Primary School
- Holy Union Primary School
- St.Mary's International School

=== Healthcare ===
The ward is home to the following health institutions:

- Arafa Daima Health Center
- St.Clara Health Center
