= Mjimwema, Kigamboni =

Ward of the Kigamboni District in the Dar es Salaam Region of Tanzania

Mjimwema Kata ya Mjimwema (Swahili)
- Ward of Kigamboni District
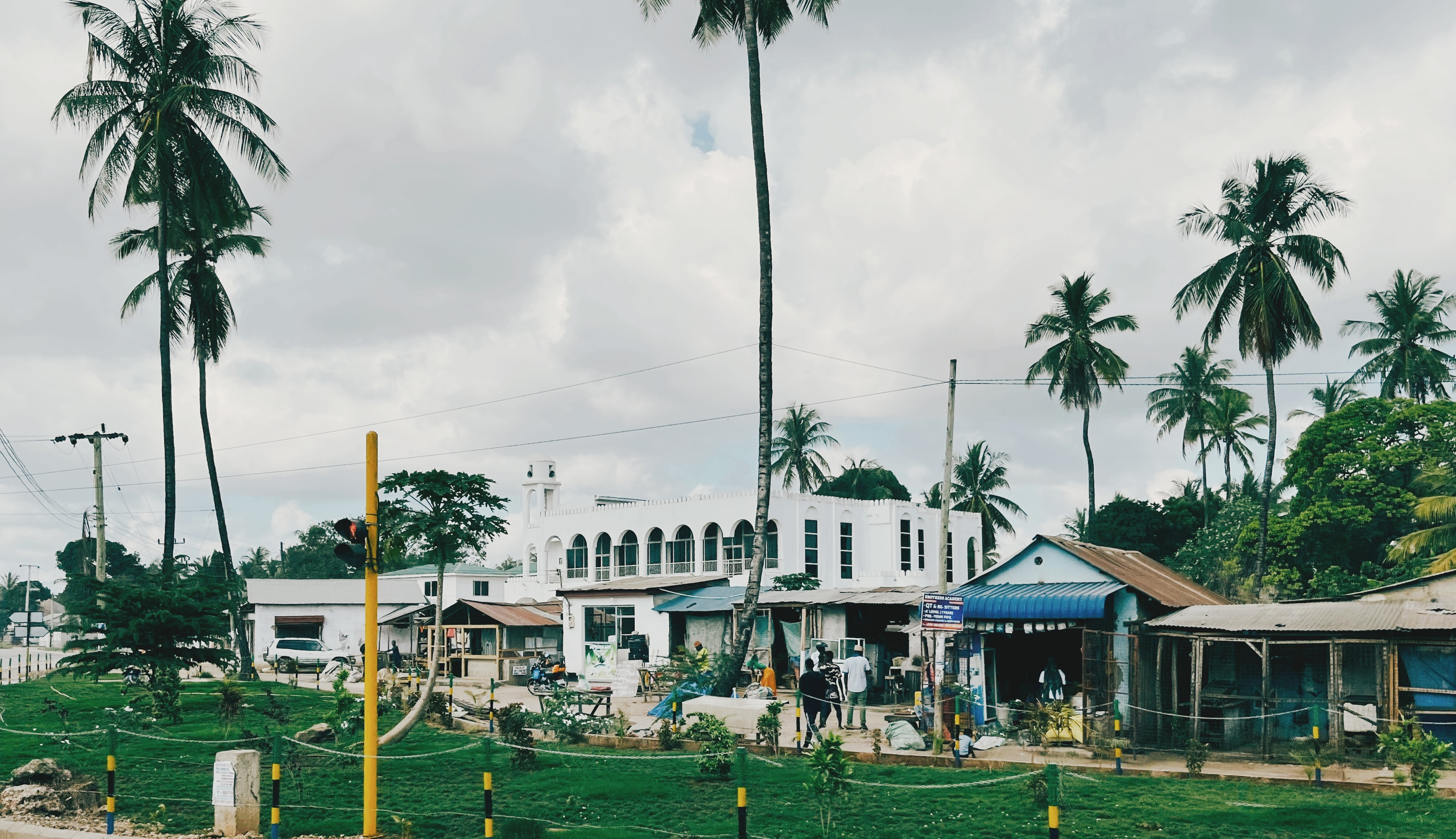
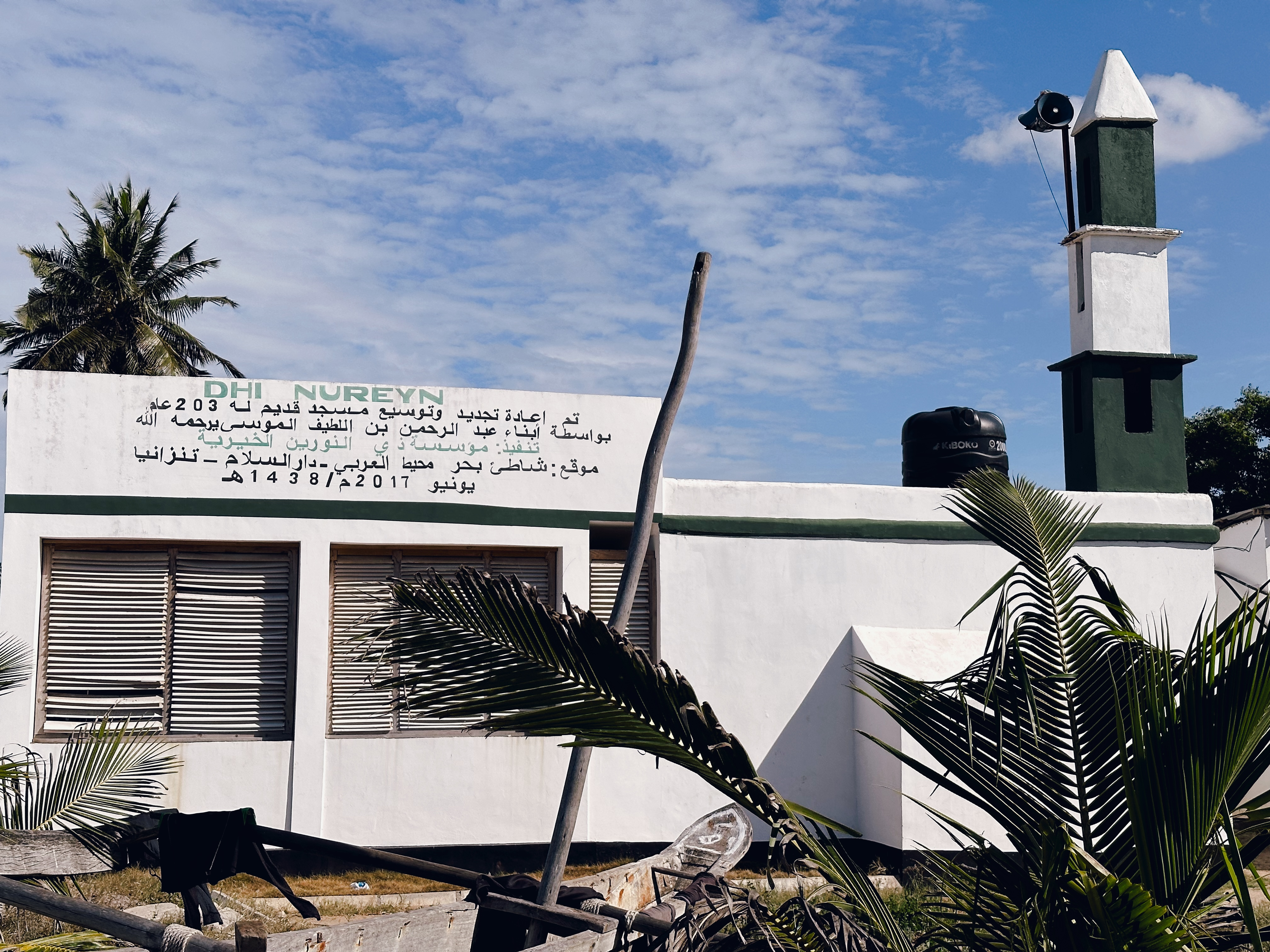
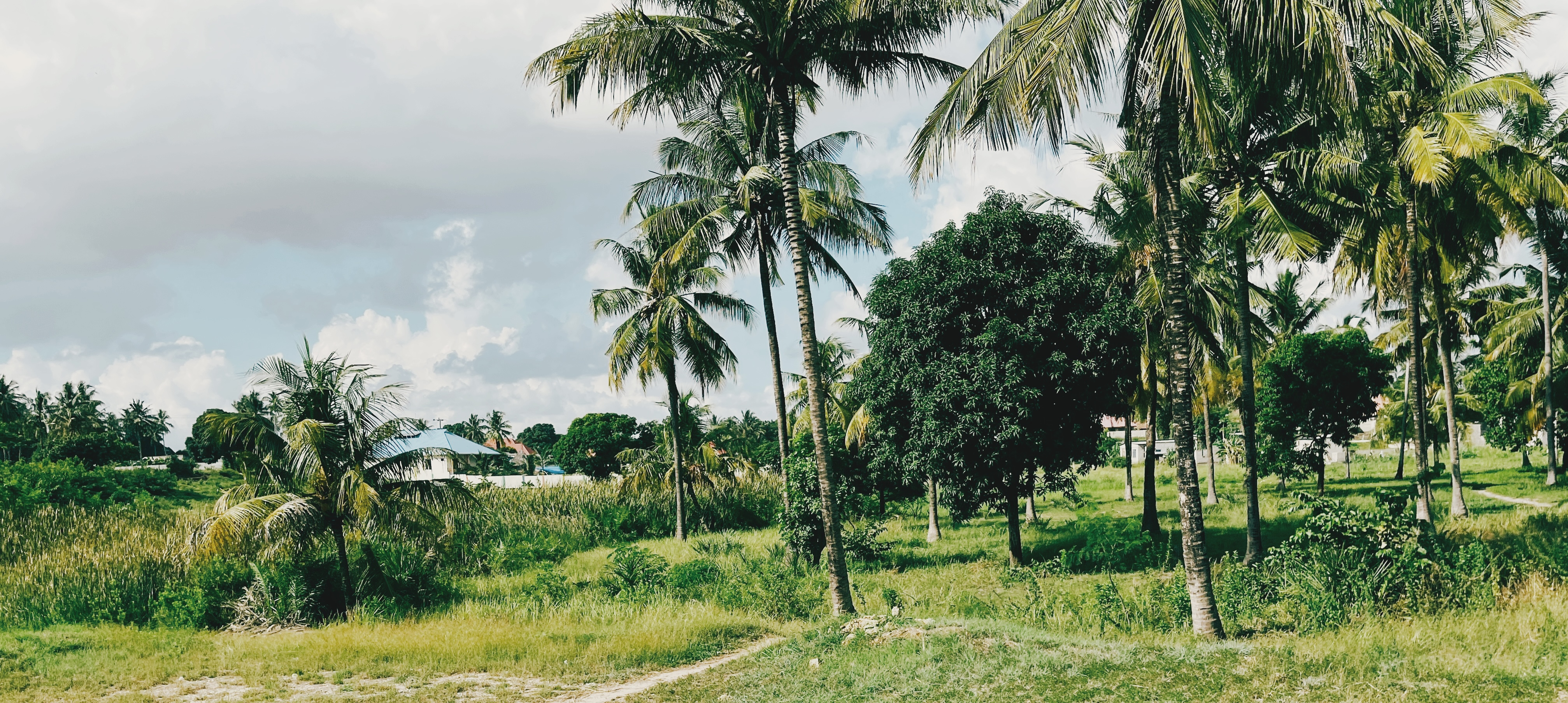
- From top to bottom: Downtown Mjimwema, Old Mosque in Old Mjimwema & Coconuts in Mjimwema ward
- Nickname: Kigamboni's ocean playground
- Interactive map of Mjimwema
- Coordinates: 6°51′1.8″S 39°21′19.8″E
- Country: Tanzania
- Region: Dar es Salaam Region
- District: Kigamboni District

Area
  - Total: 23.3 km^{2} (9.0 sq mi)

Population (2012)
  - Total: 27,789

Ethnic groups
  - Settler: Swahili
  - Ancestral: Zaramo
- Tanzanian Postal Code: 17106

Mjimwema (Kata ya Mjimwema, in Swahili) is an administrative ward in the Kigamboni district of the Dar es Salaam Region of Tanzania. Tungi and the Indian Ocean border the ward on its northern side and on the East is Somangila. South of it, it is bordered by Kibada and Kisarawe II and by Vijibweni on the west. Mjimwema is named after Medieval Swahili settlement that was once located in the ward. According to the 2012 census, the ward has a total population of 27,789.

== Administration ==
The postal code for Kibada Ward is 17106. The ward is divided into the following neighborhoods (Mitaa)/Villages (Vitongoji):

- Kibugumo
- Maweni
- Mjimwema

- Ungindoni, Mjimwema

=== Government ===
The ward, like every other ward in the country, has local government offices based on the population served.The Mjimwema Ward administration building houses a court as per the Ward Tribunal Act of 1988, including other vital departments for the administration the ward. The ward has the following administration offices:

- Mjimwema Ward Police Station
- Mjimwema Ward Government Office (Afisa Mtendaji)
- Mjimwema Ward Tribunal (Baraza La Kata) is a Department inside Ward Government Office

In the local government system of Tanzania, the ward is the smallest democratic unit. Each ward is composed of a committee of eight elected council members which include a chairperson, one salaried officer (with no voting rights), and an executive officer. One-third of seats are reserved for women councillors.

== Demographics ==
Like much of the district, the ward is the ancestral home of the Zaramo people. The ward evolved into a cosmopolitan ward as the city progressed over time. 27,789 people lived in the ward as a whole in 2012.

== Education and health ==
=== Education ===
The ward is home to these educational institutions:

- Ungindoni Primary School
- Kisota & aboud Jumbe Secondary School
- Genesis School, Kisota, Mjimwema
- Amka Primary School
- Grace Primary School, Mjimwema
- Kidete Secondary School
- Kibugumo Primary School

=== Healthcare ===
The ward is home to the following health institutions:

- Mjimwema Health Center
- E.M Hospital
- Kibada Faith Health Center
- Kibugumo Health Center
- Mnyadi Estate Health Center
- JEK Health Care Polyclinic
- Grette Health Center

== See also ==
Historic Swahili Settlements
