= Kiburugwa =

Ward of Temeke District, Dar es Salaam Region

Kiburugwa Kata ya Kiburugwa (Swahili)
- Ward of Temeke District
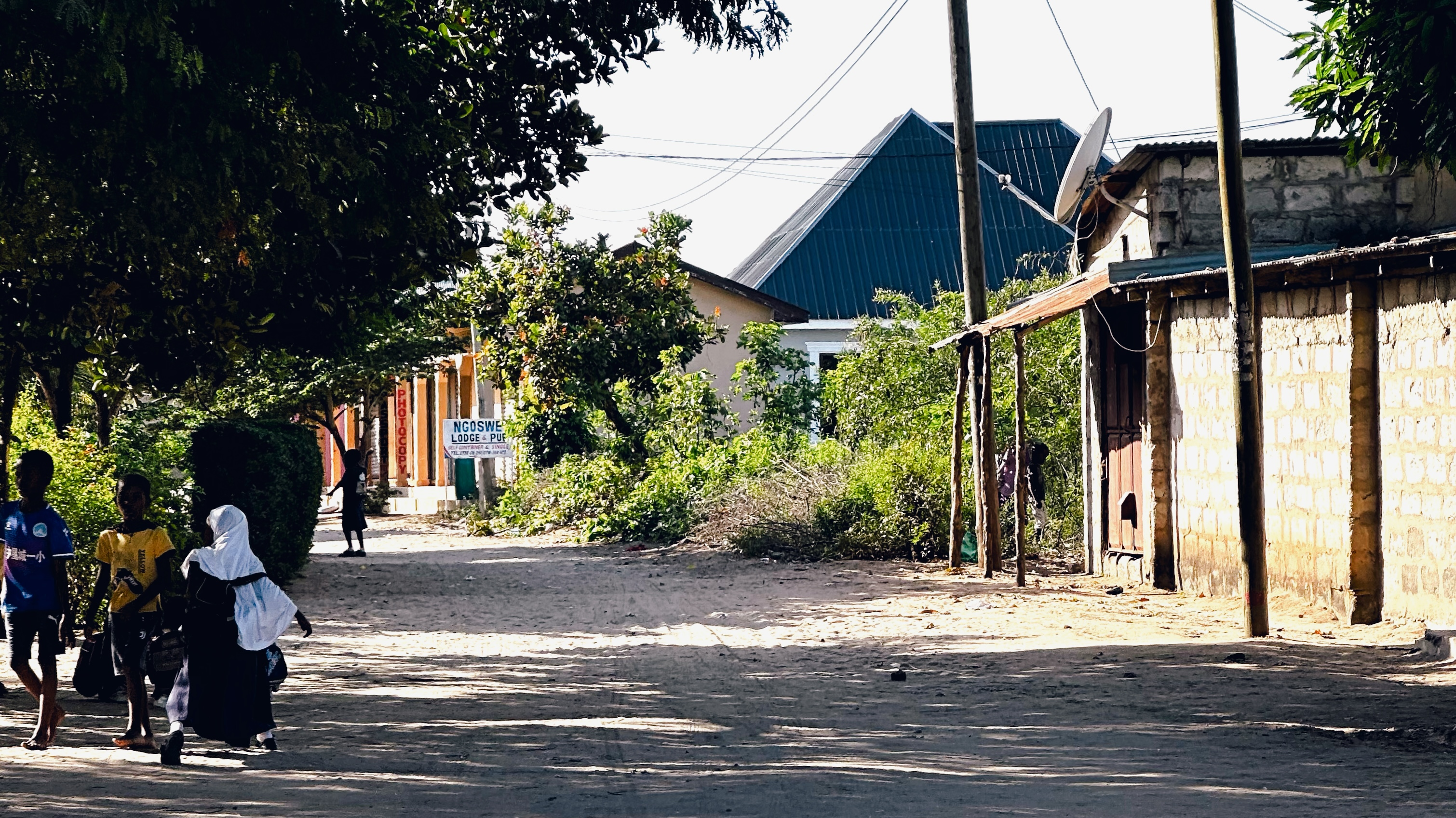
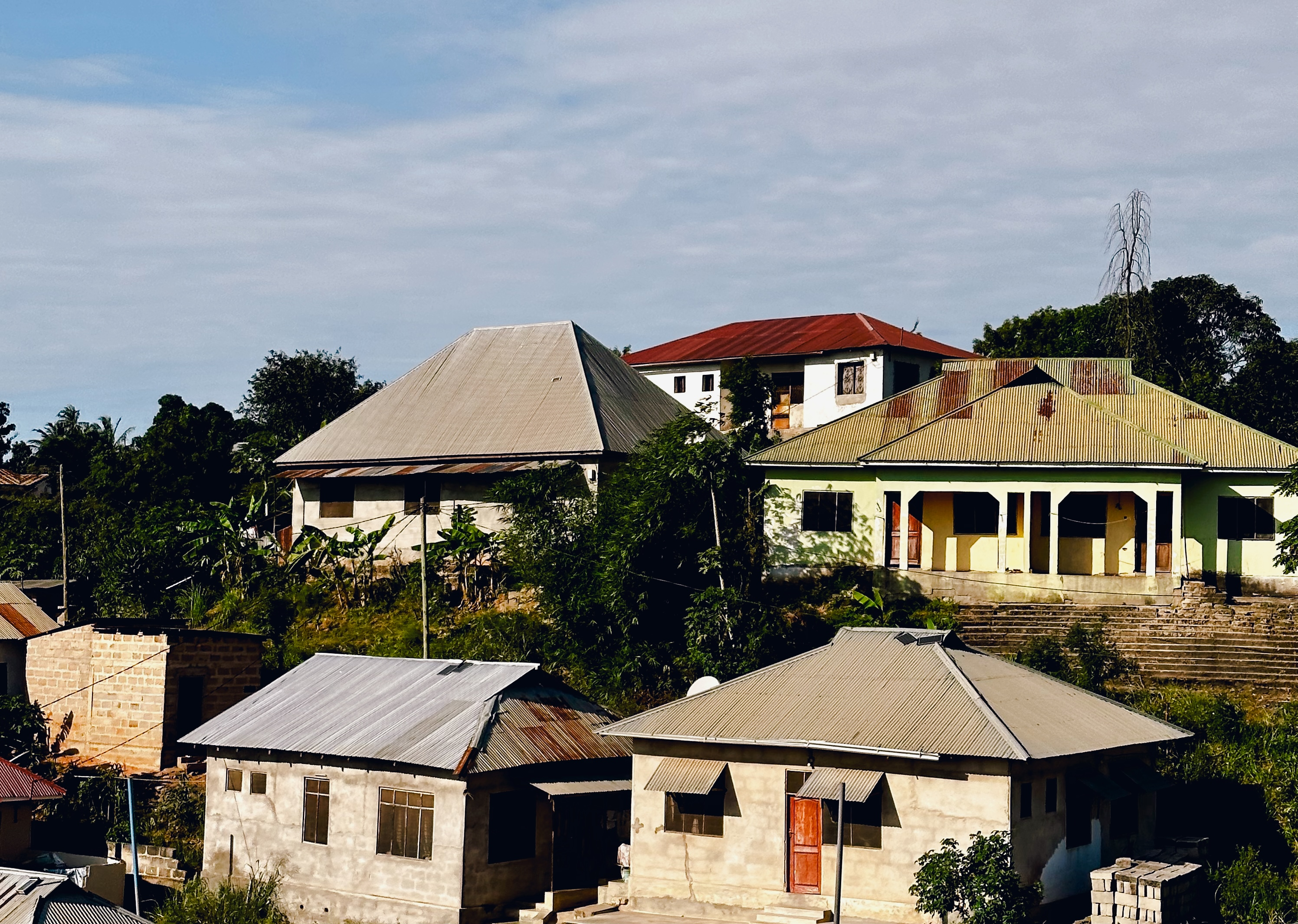
- From top to bottom: street in Kuburugwa & Houses in Kiburugwa
- Interactive map of Kiburugwa
- Coordinates: 6°54′17.28″S 39°15′3.6″E
- Country: Tanzania
- Region: Dar es Salaam Region
- District: Temeke District

Area
  - Total: 3.9 km^{2} (1.5 sq mi)

Population (2012)
  - Total: 78,911
- Demonym: Kiburugwan

Ethnic groups
  - Settler: Swahili
  - Ancestral: Zaramo
- Tanzanian Postal Code: 15128

Kiburugwa (Kata ya Kiburugwa, in Swahili) is an administrative ward in the Temeke district of the Dar es Salaam Region of Tanzania. The ward to the north is encircled by the Buza and Mbagala wards. The Charambe ward borders the ward on its eastern side. Its south west border is formed by the Kitunda ward of the Ilala District. According to the 2012 census, the ward has a total population of 78,911.

== Administration ==
The postal code for Kiburugwa Ward is 15128. The ward is divided into the following neighborhoods (Mitaa):

- Barababra ya Mwinyi
- Juhudi
- Kiburugwa

- Kiburugewa Namba 3
- Kingugi
- Kwanyoka

=== Government ===
Like every other ward in the country, the ward has local government offices based on the population served. The Kiburugwa Ward administration building houses a court as per the Ward Tribunal Act of 1988, including other vital departments for the administration of the ward. The ward has the following administration offices:

- Kiburugwa Ward Police Station
- Kiburugwa Ward Government Office (Afisa Mtendaji)
- Kiburugwa Ward Tribunal (Baraza La Kata) is a Department inside Ward Government Office

In the local government system of Tanzania, the ward is the smallest democratic unit. Each ward comprises a committee of eight elected council members, including a chairperson, one salaried officer (with no voting rights), and an executive officer. One-third of seats are reserved for women councilors.

== Demographics ==
Together with a large portion of the district, the ward serves as the ancestral home of the Zaramo people. The ward evolved into a cosmopolitan ward as the city expanded over time.

== Education and health ==
=== Education ===
The ward is home to these educational institutions:

- Kiburugwa Primary
- Juhudi Primary School
- Kigugi Secondary School

=== Healthcare ===
The ward is home to the following health institutions:

- Kigugi Health Center
- Shefa Health Center
