= Mtoni, Temeke =

Ward of Temeke District, Dar es Salaam Region

Mtoni Kata ya Mtoni (Swahili)
- Ward of Temeke District
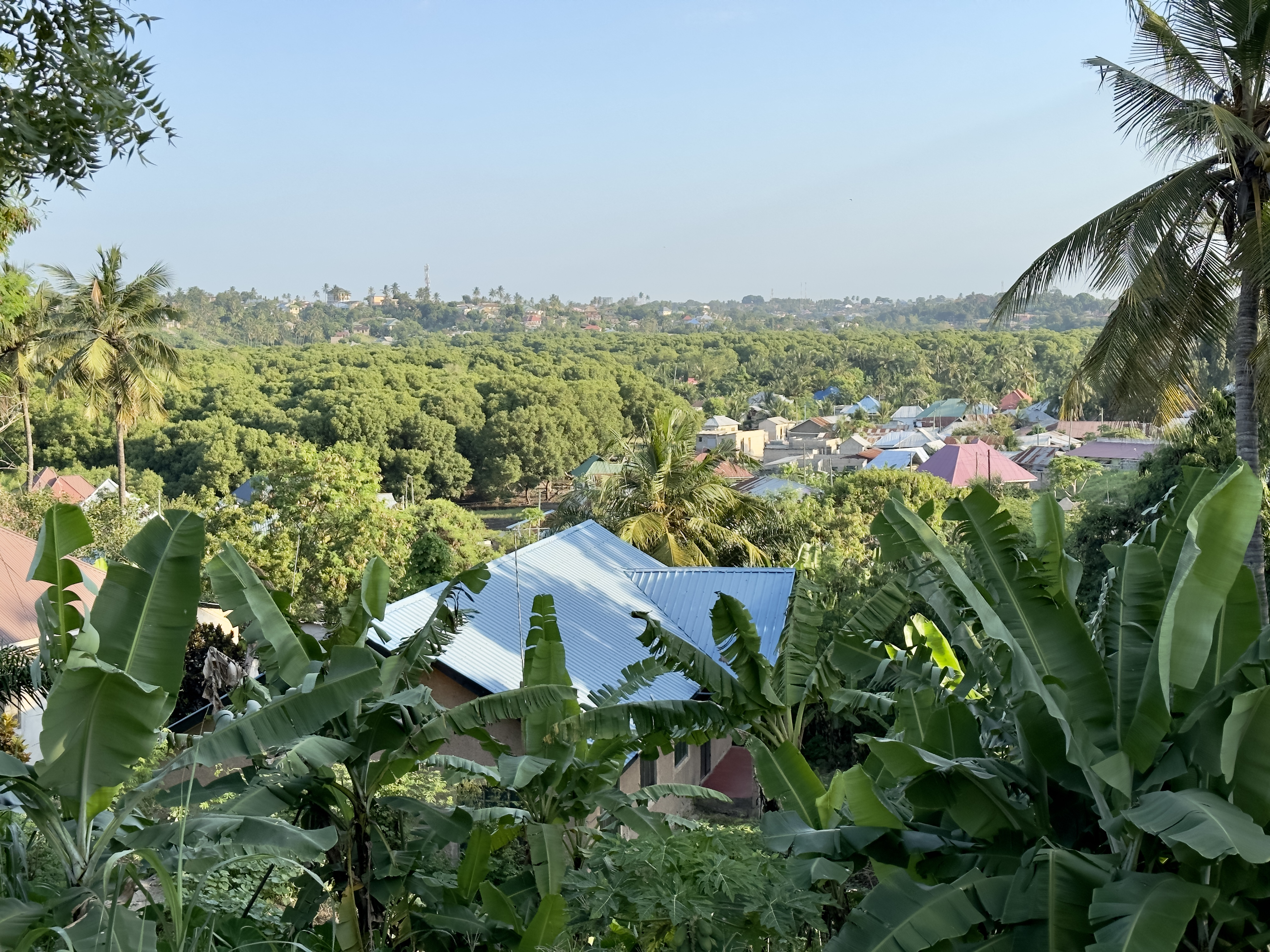
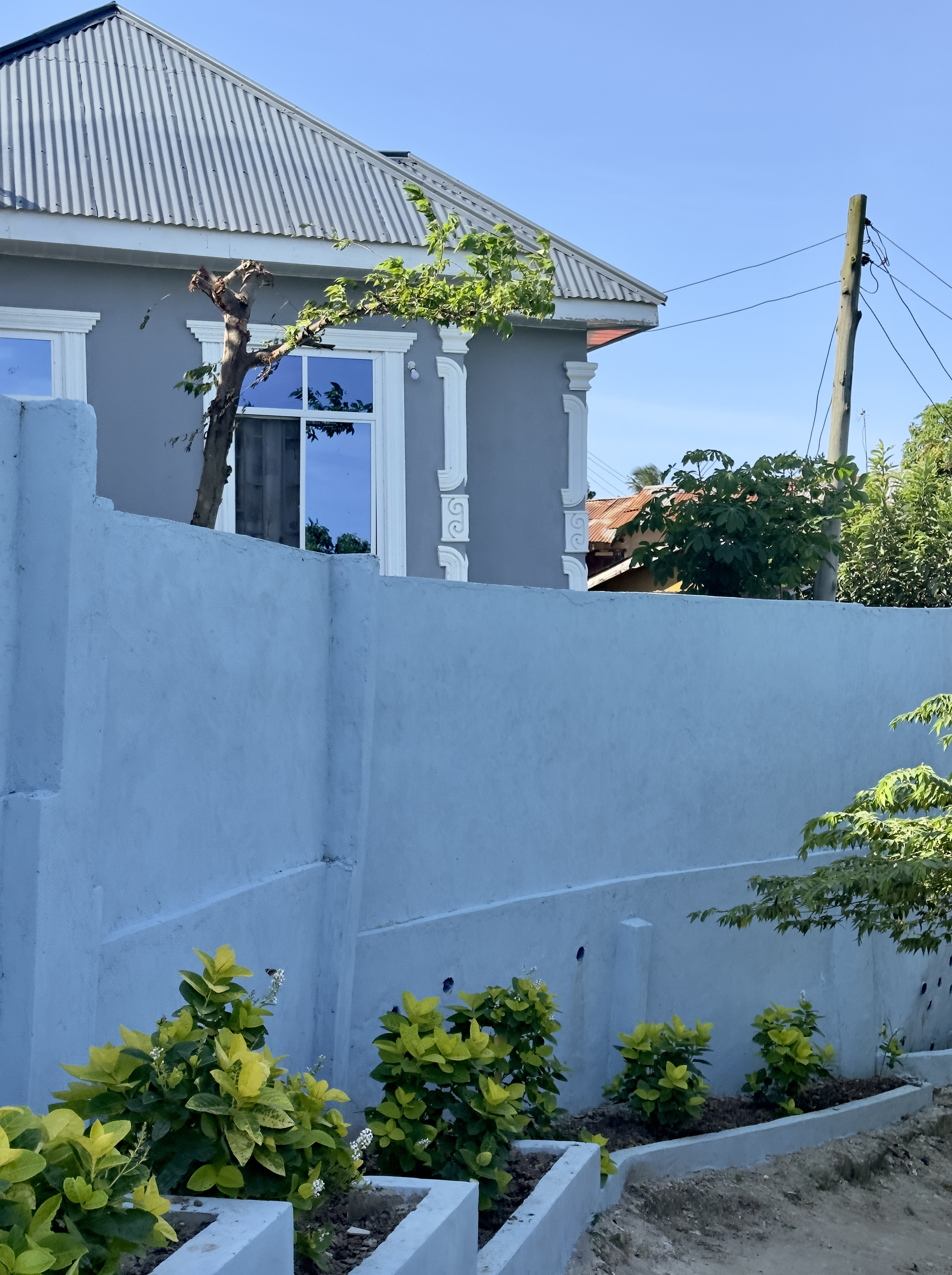
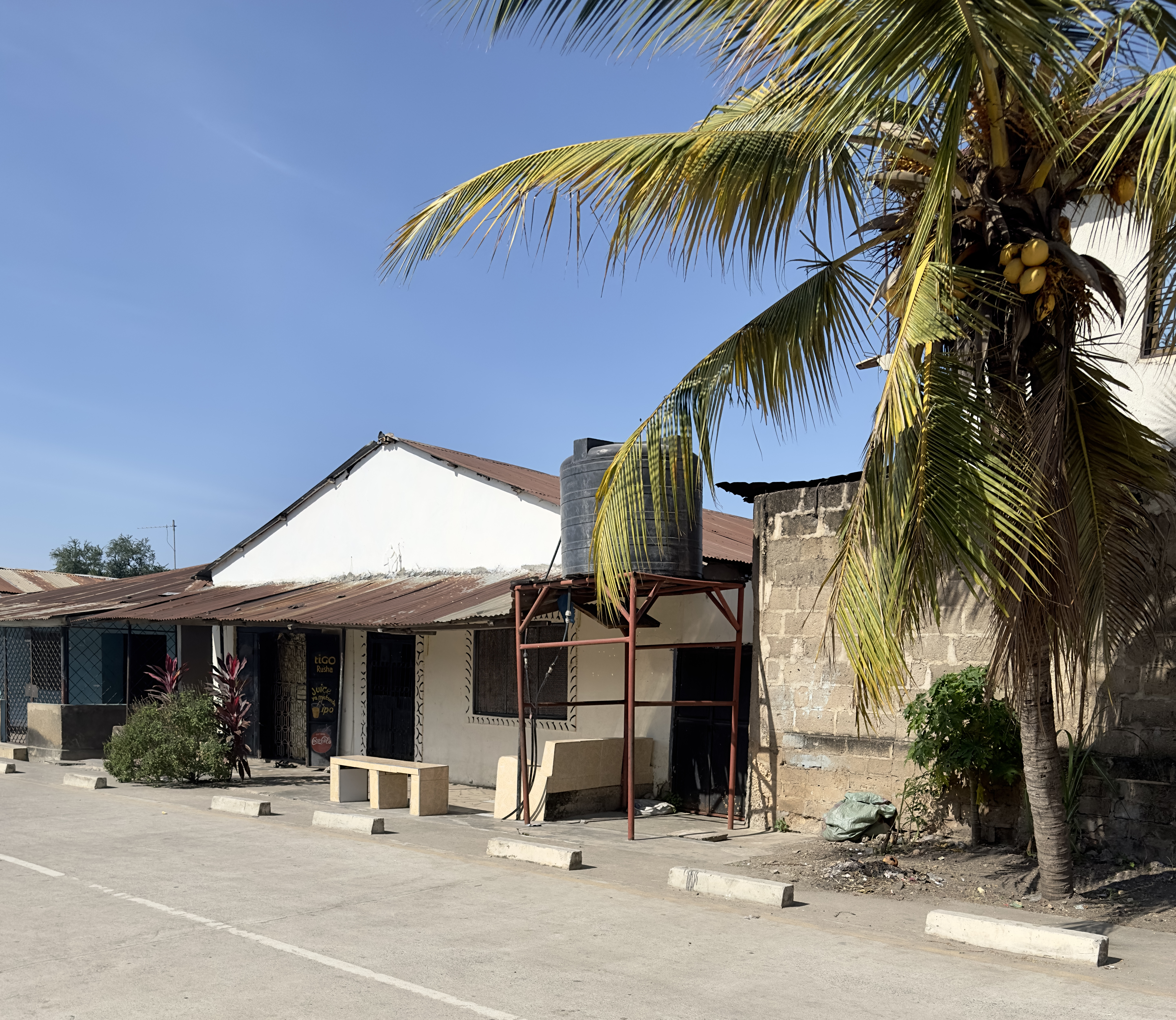
- From top to bottom: View of Mtoni Mangroves Reserve in Mtoni ward, A house in Mtoni ward and street scene in Old Mtoni ward
- Interactive map of Mtoni
- Coordinates: 6°52′13.44″S 39°16′54.84″E
- Country: Tanzania
- Region: Dar es Salaam Region
- District: Temeke District

Area
  - Total: 3.9 km^{2} (1.5 sq mi)

Population (2012)
  - Total: 59,378

Ethnic groups
  - Settler: Swahili
  - Ancestral: Zaramo
- Tanzanian Postal Code: 15108

Mtoni (Kata ya Mtoni , in Swahili) is an administrative ward in the Temeke district of the Dar es Salaam Region of Tanzania. Kurasini forms the ward's northern boundary. The Kigamboni MC's east by Vijibweni. The ward is bordered by Miburani and Azimio to the west. The ward is bordered with Kijichi to the south. According to the 2012 census, the ward has a total population of 59,378.

== Administration ==
The postal code for Mtoni Ward is 15108. The ward is divided into the following neighborhoods (Mitaa):

- Bokorani
- Bustani
- Chaurembo
- Mtoni
- Relini
- Sabasaba

=== Government ===
Like every other ward in the country, the ward has local government offices based on the population served. The Mtoni Ward administration building houses a court as per the Ward Tribunal Act of 1988, including other vital departments for the administration of the ward. The ward has the following administration offices:

- Mtoni Police Station (Kituo cha Polisi)
- Mtoni Government Office ( Ofisi ya Afisa Mtendaji wa Kata)
- Mtoni Tribunal (Baraza La Kata) is a Department inside Ward Government Office

In the local government system of Tanzania, the ward is the smallest democratic unit. Each ward comprises a committee of eight elected council members, including a chairperson, one salaried officer (with no voting rights), and an executive officer. One-third of seats are reserved for women councilors.

== Demographics ==
The ward serves as the Zaramo people's ancestral home, along with much of the district. As the city developed over time, the ward became a cosmopolitan ward with a population of 59,378 as of 2012.

== Education and health ==
=== Education ===
The ward is home to these educational institutions:

- Mtoni Maalum Primary School
- Relini Secondary School, Mtoni
- Al-Mustaqiim Primary School, Mtoni
- Mtoni Primary School, Mtoni
- Mtoni Sabasaba Primary School
- Bwawani Primary School

=== Healthcare ===
The ward is home to the following health institutions:

- Mandela Health Center, Mtoni
- Mtoni Maalum Health Center
- MICO Mtoni Health Centre
- KKKT Mtoni Health Center
- Mtoni Health Center
