= Toangoma =

Ward of Temeke District, Dar es Salaam Region

Toangoma Kata ya Toangoma (Swahili)
- Ward of Temeke District
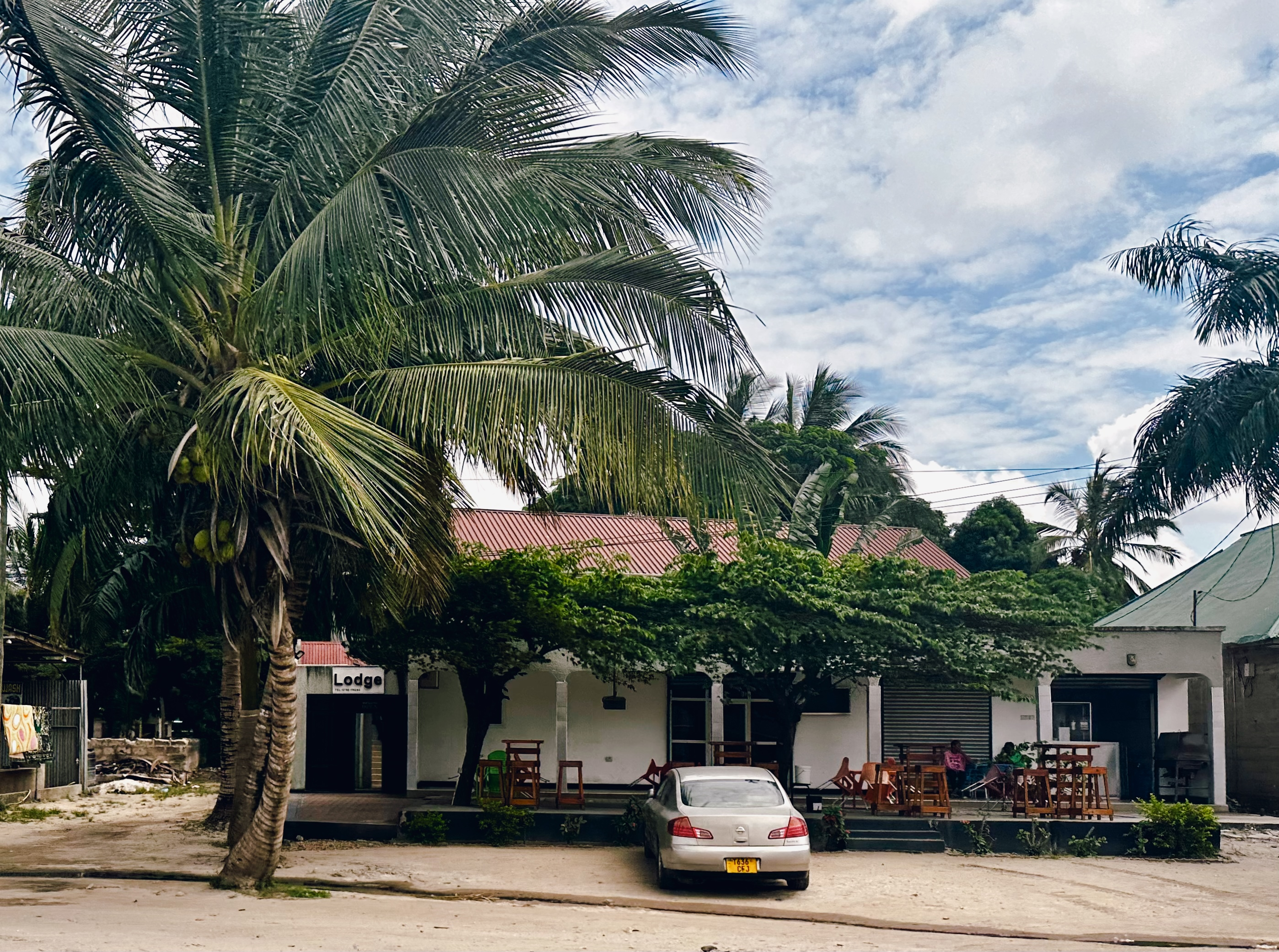
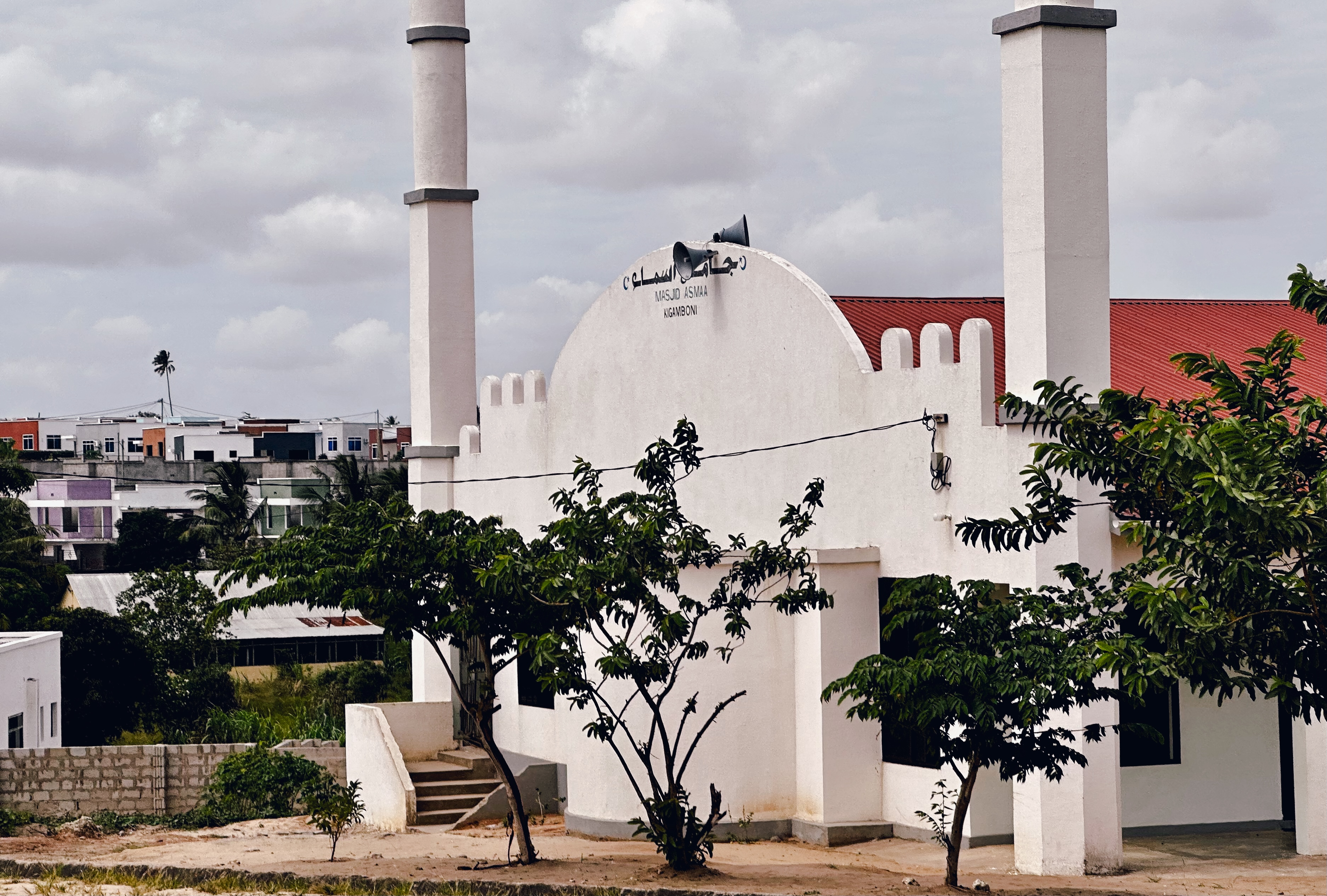
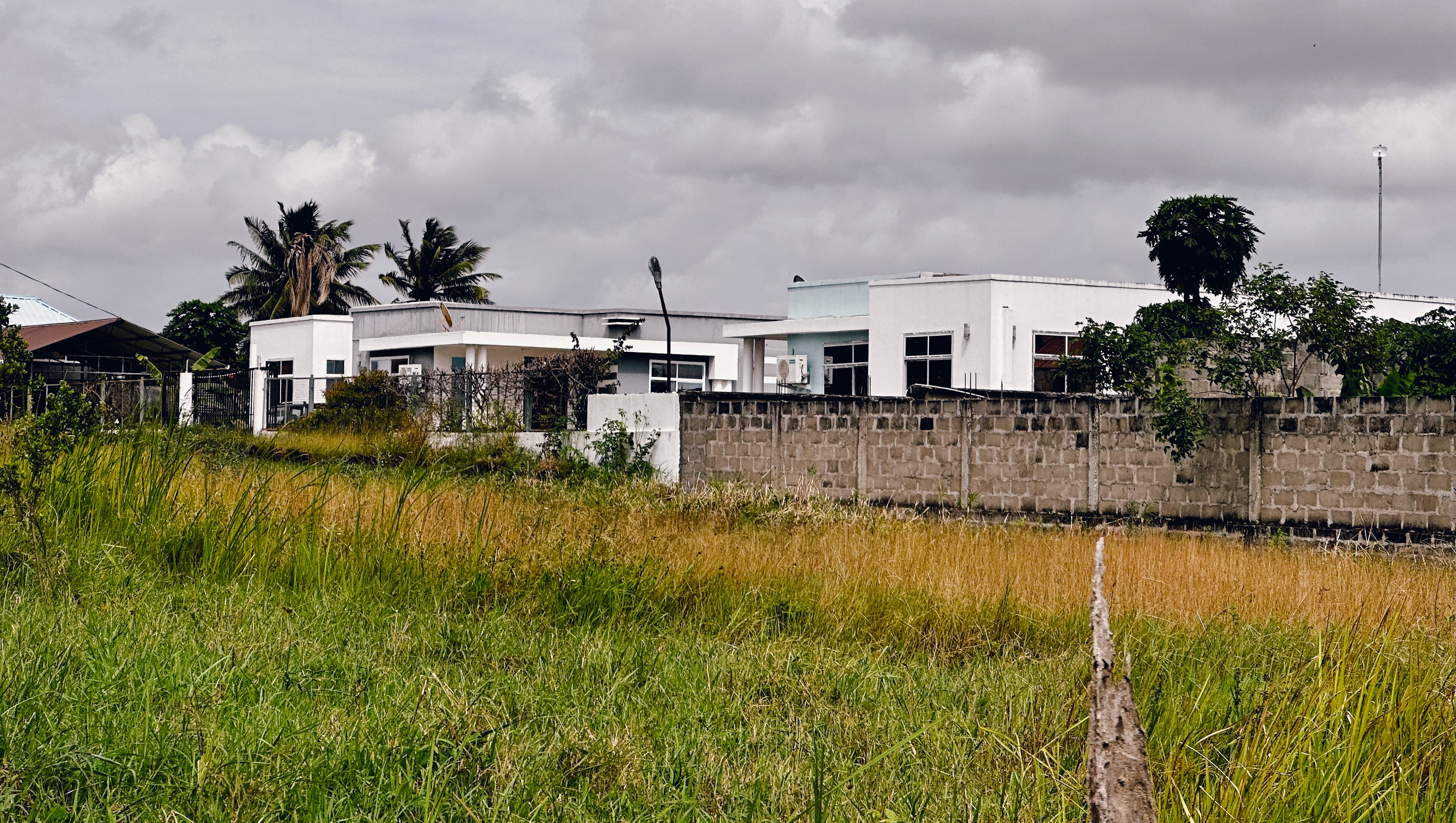
- From top to bottom: Strret scene in Toangoma, Mosque in Toangoma and gated community in Toangoma
- Interactive map of Toangoma
- Coordinates: 6°56′0.96″S 39°18′8.28″E
- Country: Tanzania
- Region: Dar es Salaam Region
- District: Temeke District

Area
  - Total: 37.6 km^{2} (14.5 sq mi)

Population (2012)
  - Total: 44,578

Ethnic groups
  - Settler: Swahili
  - Ancestral: Zaramo
- Tanzanian Postal Code: 15118

Toangoma (Kata ya Toangoma , in Swahili) is an administrative ward in the Temeke district of the Dar es Salaam Region of Tanzania. Kijichi and Kibada, the latter of which is a ward of Kigamboni MC, form the ward's northern and western boundaries. The west the ward is bordered by Mianzini and Mbagala Kuu. The ward is bordered to the east by Kisarawe II of Kigamboni MC. The ward is bordered to the south by the Pwani Region's Tambani and Vikindu. According to the 2012 census, the ward has a total population of 44,578.

== Administration ==
The postal code for Toangoma Ward is 15118. The ward is divided into the following neighborhoods (Mitaa):

- Changanyikeni
- Goroka "A"
- Goroka "B"
- Kongowe
- Malela
- Masaki
- Masuliza
- Mikwambe
- Mwapemba
- Mzinga "A"
- Mzinga "B"
- Ponde
- Toangoma
- Vikunai

=== Government ===
Like every other ward in the country, the ward has local government offices based on the population served. The Toangoma Ward administration building houses a court as per the Ward Tribunal Act of 1988, including other vital departments for the administration of the ward. The ward has the following administration offices:

- Toangoma Police Station (Kituo cha Polisi)
- Toangoma Government Office ( Ofisi ya Afisa Mtendaji wa Kata)
- Toangoma Tribunal (Baraza La Kata) is a Department inside Ward Government Office

In the local government system of Tanzania, the ward is the smallest democratic unit. Each ward comprises a committee of eight elected council members, including a chairperson, one salaried officer (with no voting rights), and an executive officer. One-third of seats are reserved for women councilors.

== Demographics ==
The ward serves as the Zaramo people's ancestral home, along with much of the district. As the city developed over time, the ward became a cosmopolitan ward with a population of 44,578 as of 2012.

== Education and health ==
=== Education ===
The ward is home to these educational institutions:

- Toangoma Primary School
- Taneem Primary School
- Agape Mbagala Primary School
- Rainbow Primary School
- Stanley Secondary School, Toangoma
- Joyland International School, Toangoma

=== Healthcare ===
The ward is home to the following health institutions:

- Pasaka Health Center
- Toangoma Health Center
- DSK Health Center
- Kesheni Mission Health Center
- Tumaini Mission Health Center
- Stella Health Polyclini
- Emarat Health Center
- Mtiro Health Center
