= Kijichi =

Ward of Temeke District, Dar es Salaam Region

Kijichi Kata ya Kijichi (Swahili)
- Ward of Temeke District
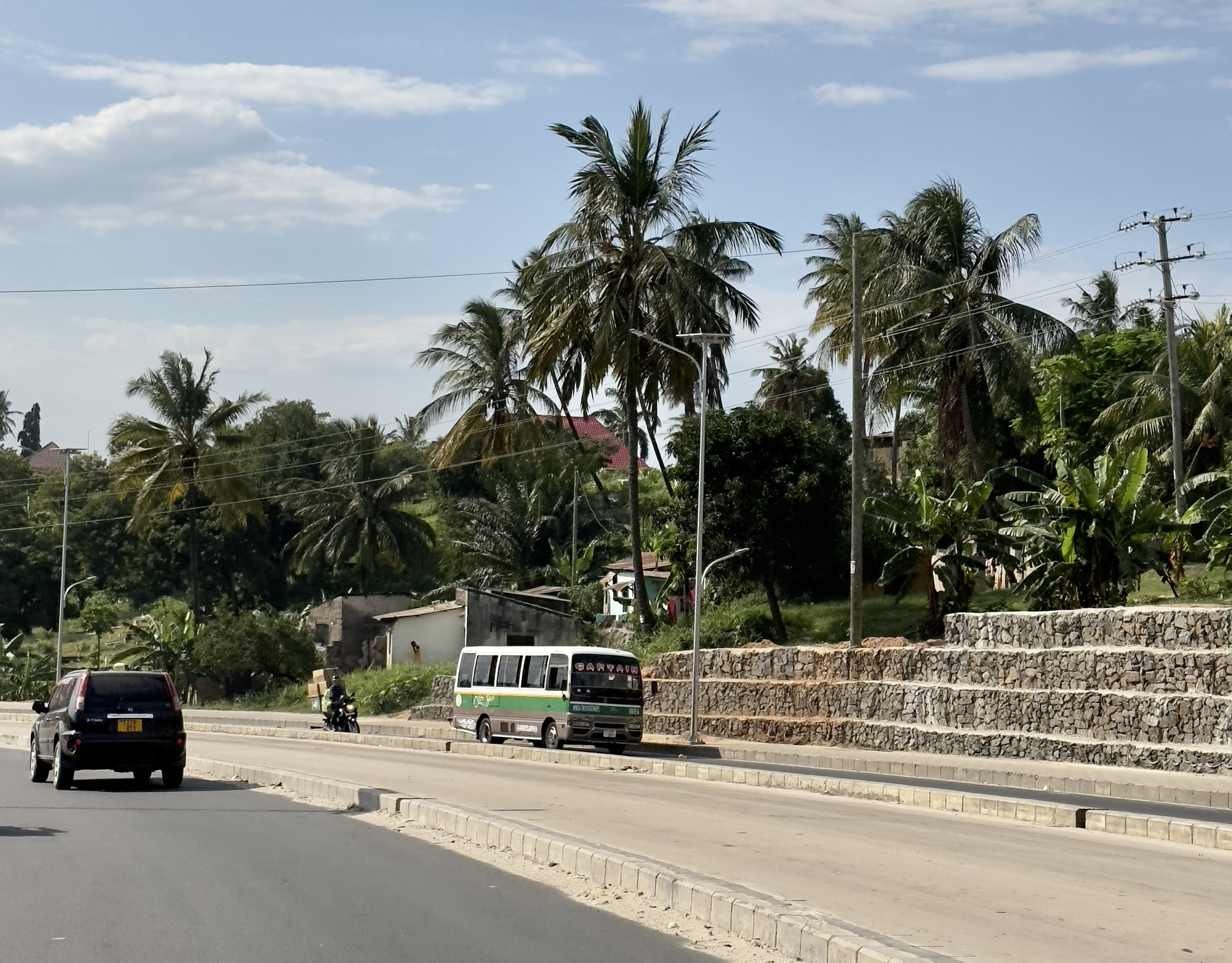
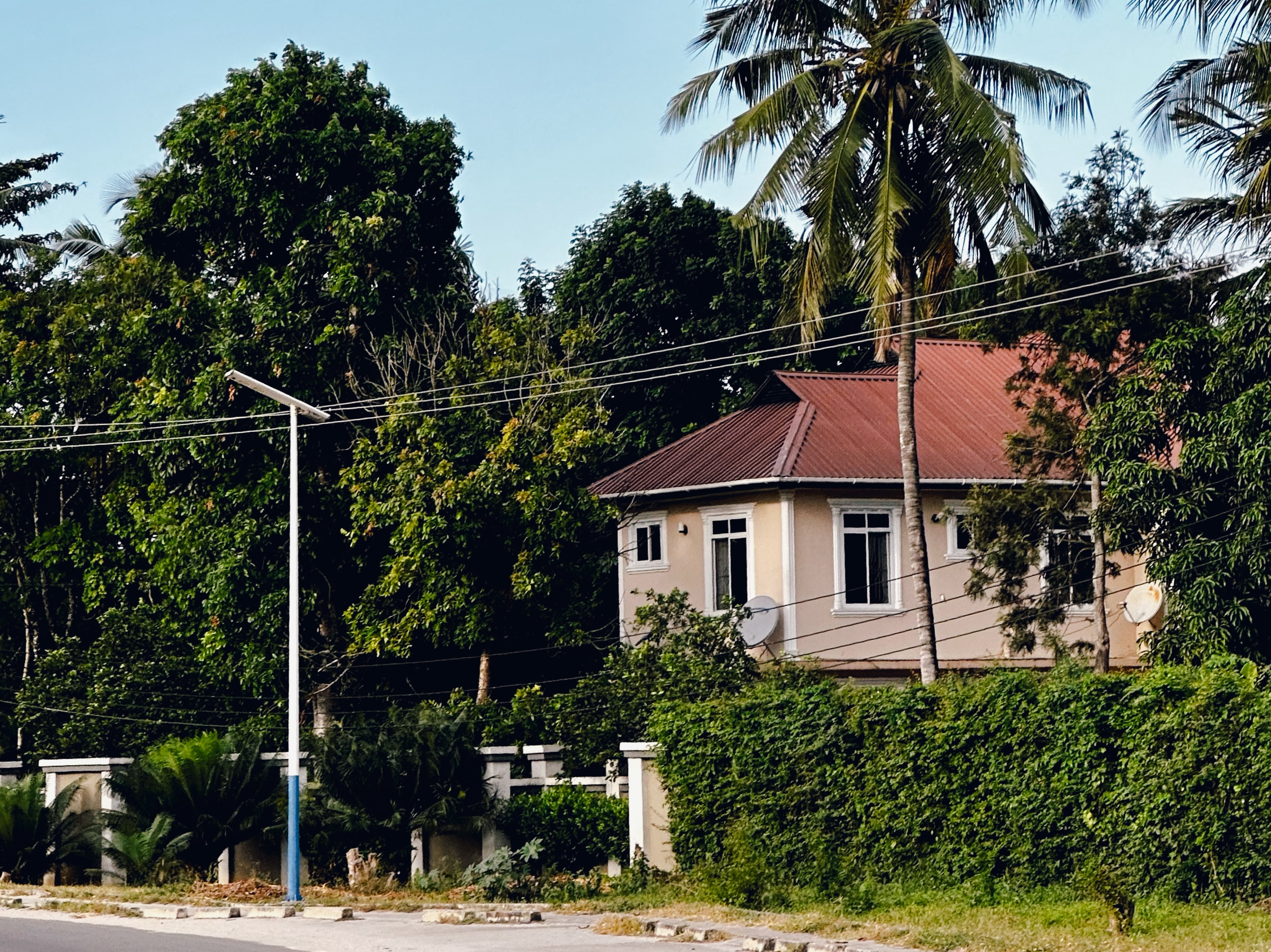
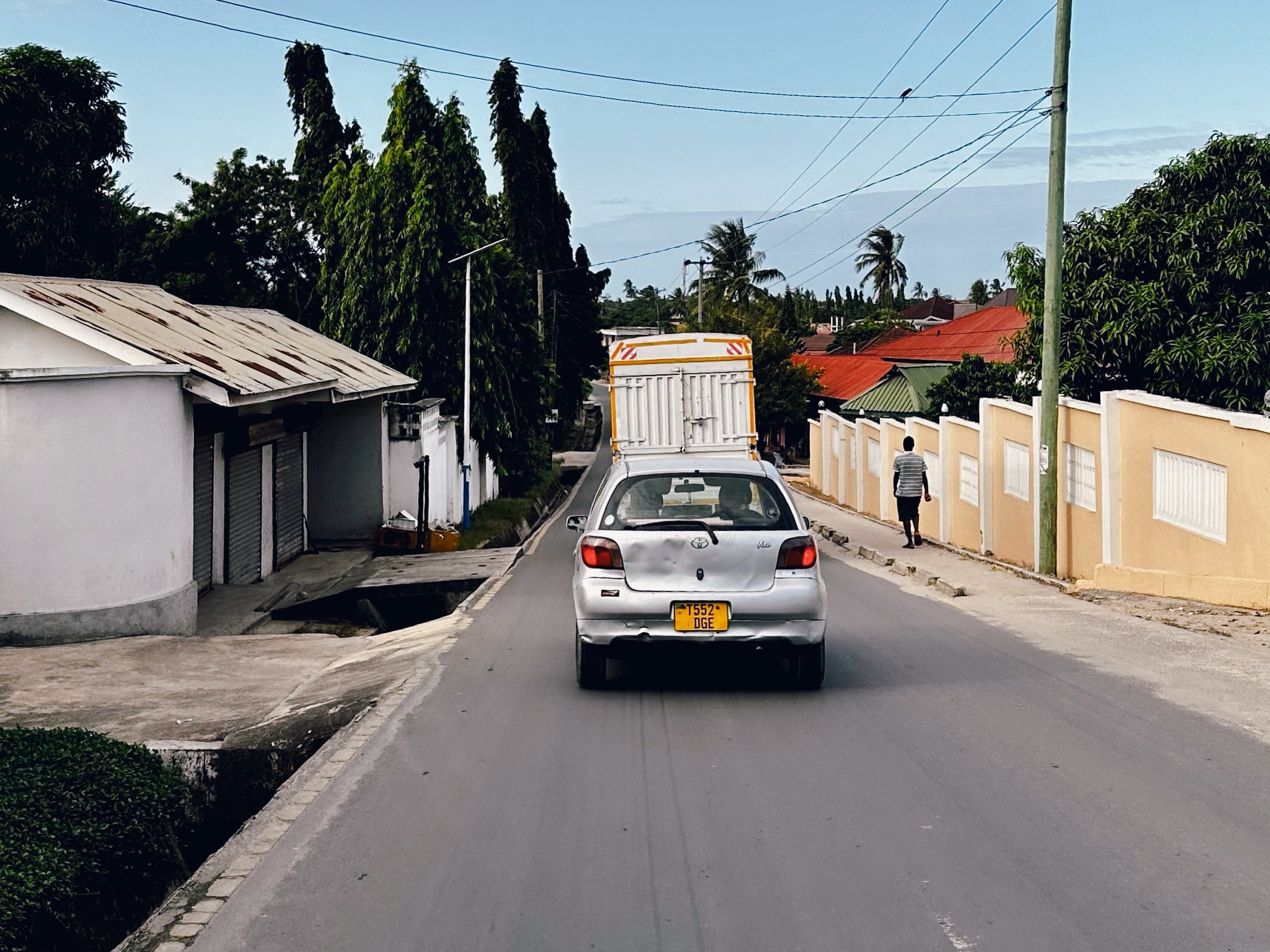
- From top to bottom: Kilwa road through Kijichi ward & High income homes in Kijichi & street in Kijichi
- Interactive map of Kijichi
- Coordinates: 6°53′33″S 39°17′0.96″E
- Country: Tanzania
- Region: Dar es Salaam Region
- District: Temeke District

Area
  - Total: 11.7 km^{2} (4.5 sq mi)

Population (2012)
  - Total: 69,195
- Demonym: Kijichi

Ethnic groups
  - Settler: Swahili
  - Ancestral: Zaramo
- Tanzanian Postal Code: 15129

Kijichi (Kata ya Kijichi, in Swahili) is an administrative ward in the Temeke district of the Dar es Salaam Region of Tanzania. The ward is bounded to the north by the Indian Ocean, the Mtoni ward, and the Vijibweni ward in the Kigamboni District. Kibada ward and Toangoma ward, both in the Kigamboni District, border it on the east. The wards of Mbagala Kuu and Azimio border Kijichi to the west. According to the 2012 census, the ward has a total population of 69,195.

== Administration ==
The postal code for Kijichi Ward is 15129. The ward is divided into the following neighborhoods (Mitaa):

- Butiama
- Mgeni Nani
- Misheni

- Mtoni Kijichi
- Mwanamtoti

=== Government ===
Like every other ward in the country, the ward has local government offices based on the population served. The Kijichi Ward administration building houses a court as per the Ward Tribunal Act of 1988, including other vital departments for the administration of the ward. The ward has the following administration offices:

- Kijichi Ward Police Station
- Kijichi Ward Government Office (Afisa Mtendaji)
- Kijichi Ward Tribunal (Baraza La Kata) is a Department inside Ward Government Office

In the local government system of Tanzania, the ward is the smallest democratic unit. Each ward comprises a committee of eight elected council members, including a chairperson, one salaried officer (with no voting rights), and an executive officer. One-third of seats are reserved for women councilors.

== Demographics ==
The ward serves as the Zaramo ancestral home along with a sizable chunk of the district. The ward changed over time as the city grew, becoming a cosmopolitan ward.

== Education and health ==
=== Education ===
The ward is home to these educational institutions:

- New Vision Primary School
- Bwawani Primary School
- Kijichi Primary School
- Holy Cross Primary School
- Anlex Primary School
- Doris Primary School
- Helasita Secondary School

=== Healthcare ===
The ward is home to the following health institutions:

- Consolata Sisters Health Center
- Mtoni Kijichi Health Center
- Mico Mgeninani Dispensary
