= Charambe =

Ward in Dar es Salaam Region, Tanzania

Charambe Kata ya Charambe (Swahili)
- Ward of Temeke District
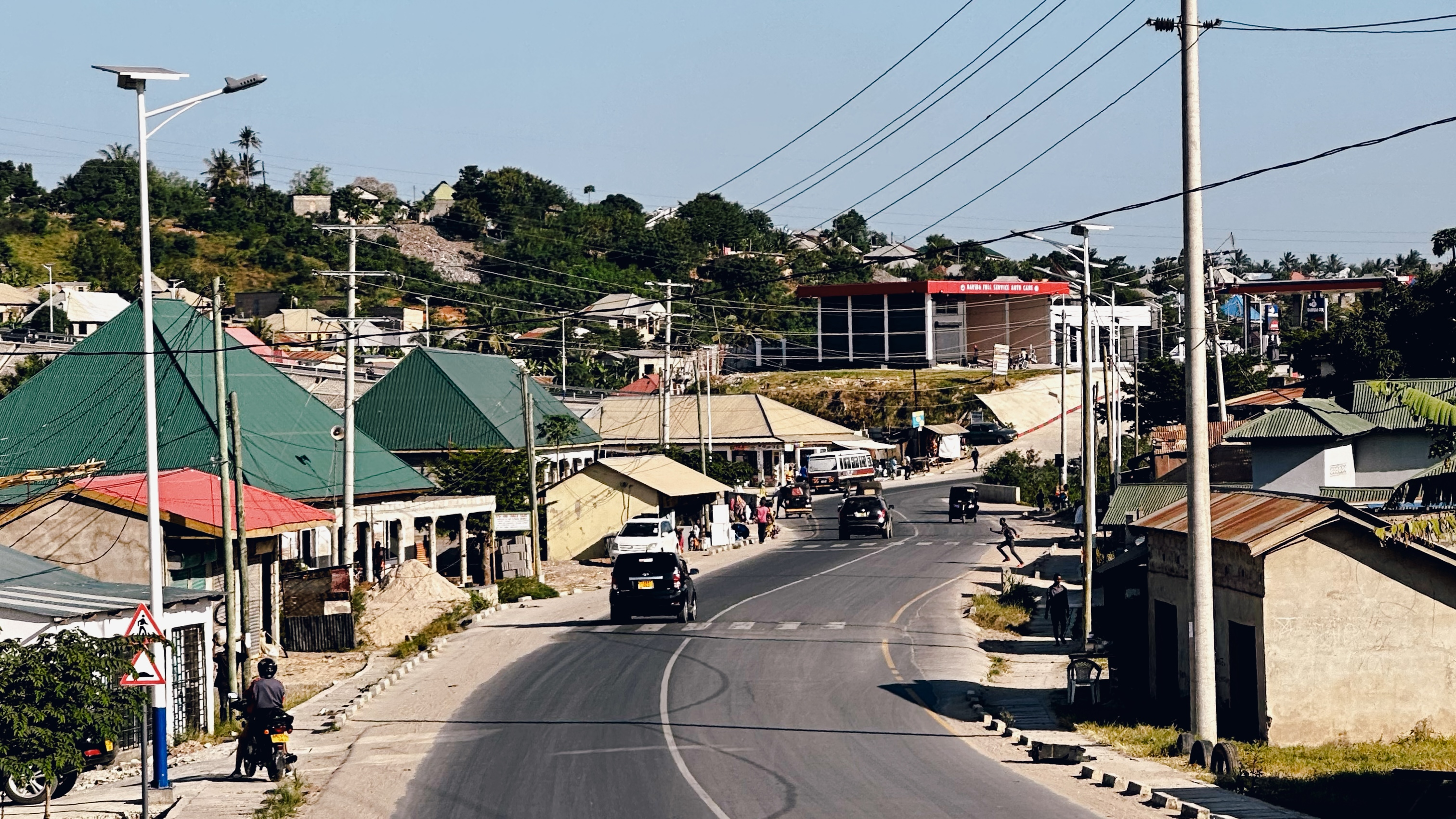
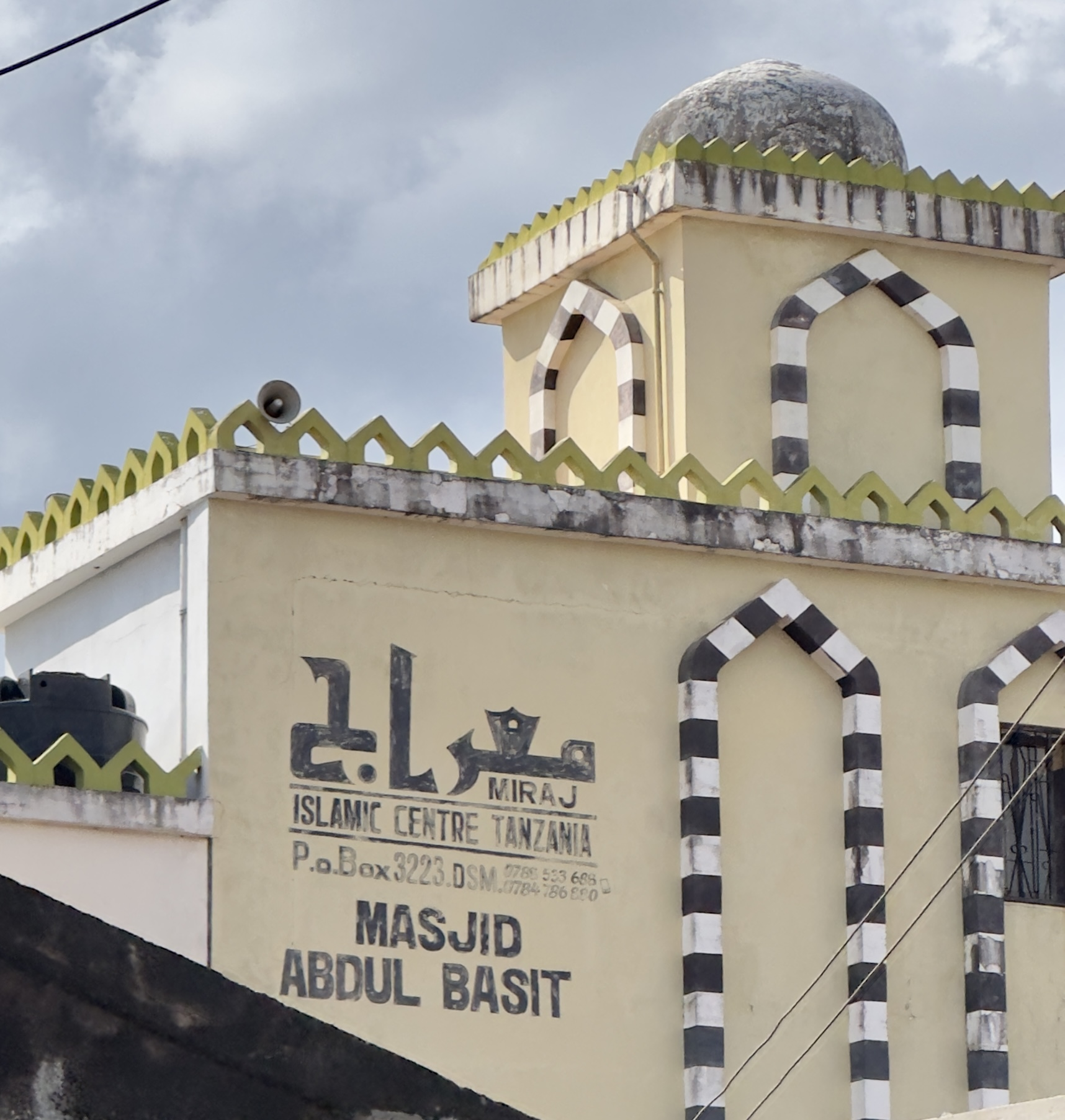
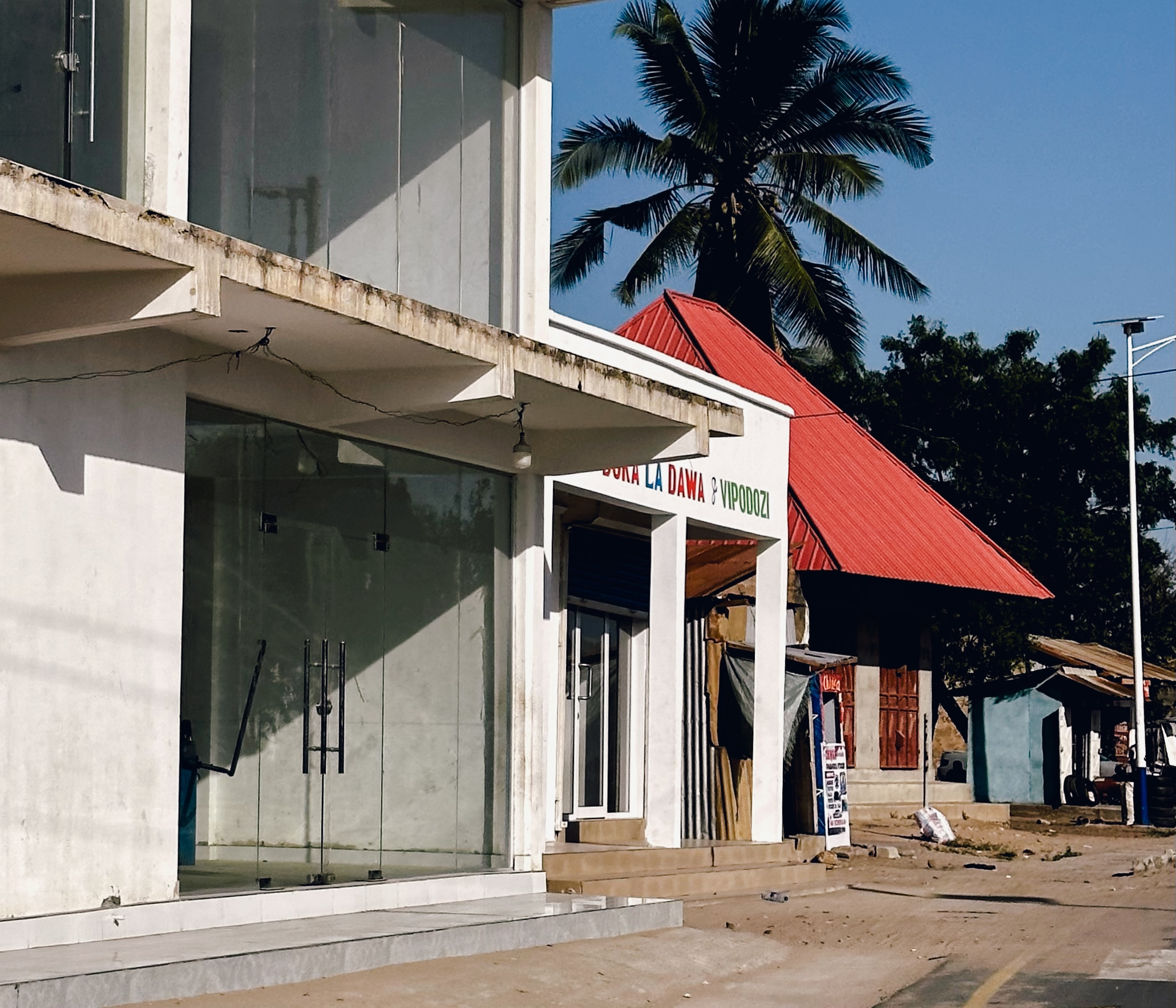
- From top to bottom: Scene in Charambe, Masjid Abdul Basit Mosque in Charambe & Shops in Charambe ward
- Interactive map of Charambe
- Coordinates: 6°55′10.56″S 39°15′23.76″E
- Country: Tanzania
- Region: Dar es Salaam Region
- District: Temeke District

Area
  - Total: 7.3 km^{2} (2.8 sq mi)

Population (2012)
  - Total: 101,933

Ethnic groups
  - Settler: Swahili
  - Ancestral: Zaramo
- Tanzanian Postal Code: 15117

Charambe (Kata ya Charambe , in Swahili) is an administrative ward in the Temeke district of the Dar es Salaam Region of Tanzania. North of the ward, Kuburugwa and Mbagala form its borders. Mianzini ward is to the east and south. Ilala MC's Kitunda Ward lies to the west together with Chamazi. According to the 2012 census, the ward has a total population of 101,933.

== Administration ==
The postal code for Charambe Ward is 15117. The ward is divided into the following neighborhoods (Mitaa):

- Kurasini Mji Mpya
- Machinjoni "A"

- Nzasa "B"
- Rangi Tatu, Charambe

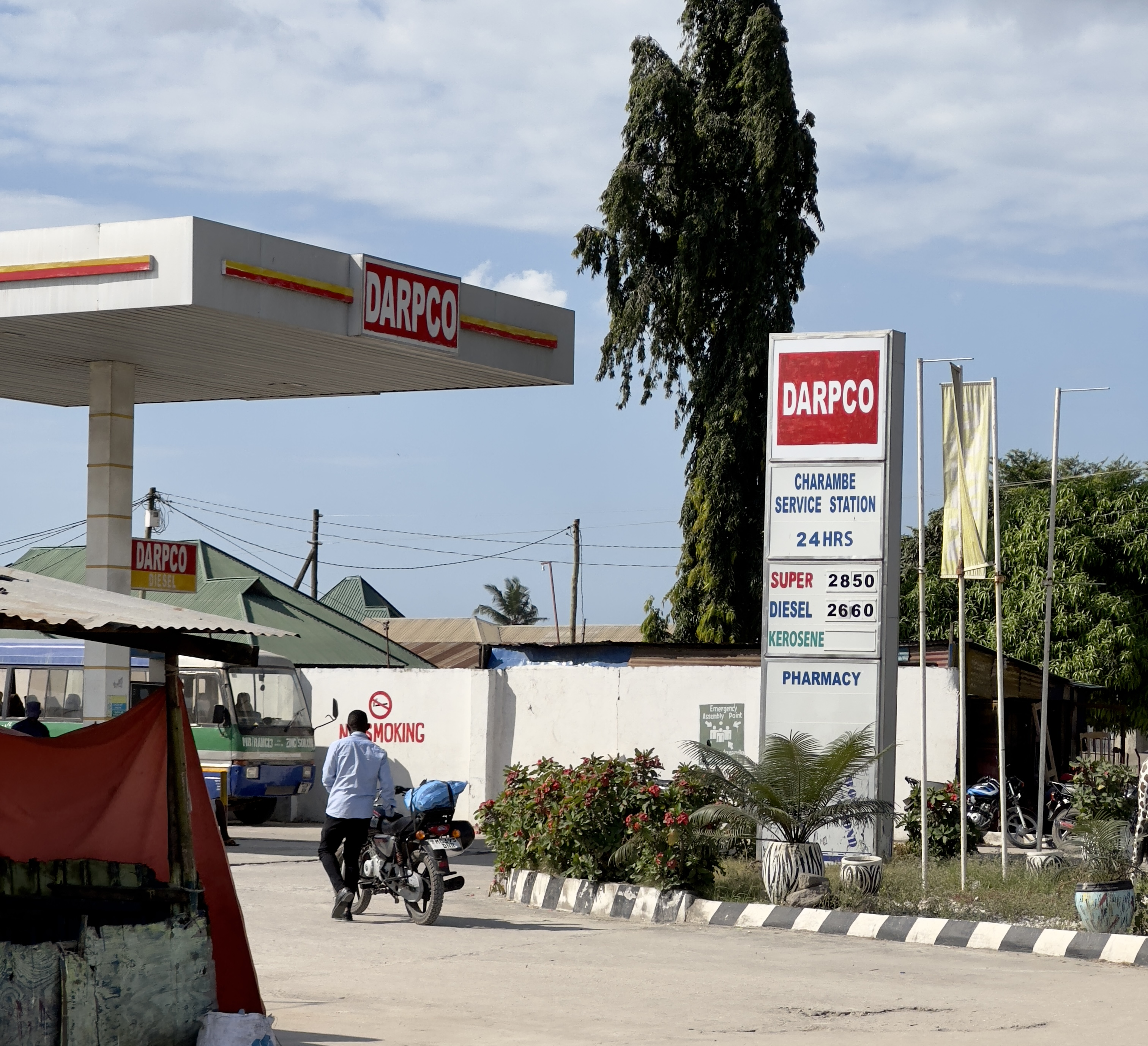
Petrol station in Charambe, Temeke MC, Dar es Salaam

=== Government ===
Like every other ward in the country, the ward has local government offices based on the population served. The Charambe Ward administration building houses a court as per the Ward Tribunal Act of 1988, including other vital departments for the administration of the ward. The ward has the following administration offices:

- Charambe Police Station (Kituo cha Polisi)
- Charambe Government Office ( Ofisi ya Afisa Mtendaji wa Kata)
- Charambe Tribunal (Baraza La Kata) is a Department inside Ward Government Office

In the local government system of Tanzania, the ward is the smallest democratic unit. Each ward comprises a committee of eight elected council members, including a chairperson, one salaried officer (with no voting rights), and an executive officer. One-third of seats are reserved for women councilors.

== Demographics ==
The ward serves as the Zaramo people's ancestral home, along with much of the district. As the city developed over time, the ward became a cosmopolitan ward with a population of 101,933 as of 2012.

== Education and health ==
=== Education ===
The ward is home to these educational institutions:

- Marten Lumbanga Primary School
- Nzasa Primary School
- Nzasa "A" Primary School
- Charambe Primary School
- Kilamba Primary School
- Chemchem Primary School
- Nzasa Secondary School

=== Healthcare ===
The ward is home to the following health institutions:

- Swash Polyclinic, Charambe
