= Temeke District =

District of Dar es Salaam Region, Tanzania

Temeke District Halimashauri ya Manispaa ya Temeke (Swahili)
- District of Dar es Salaam
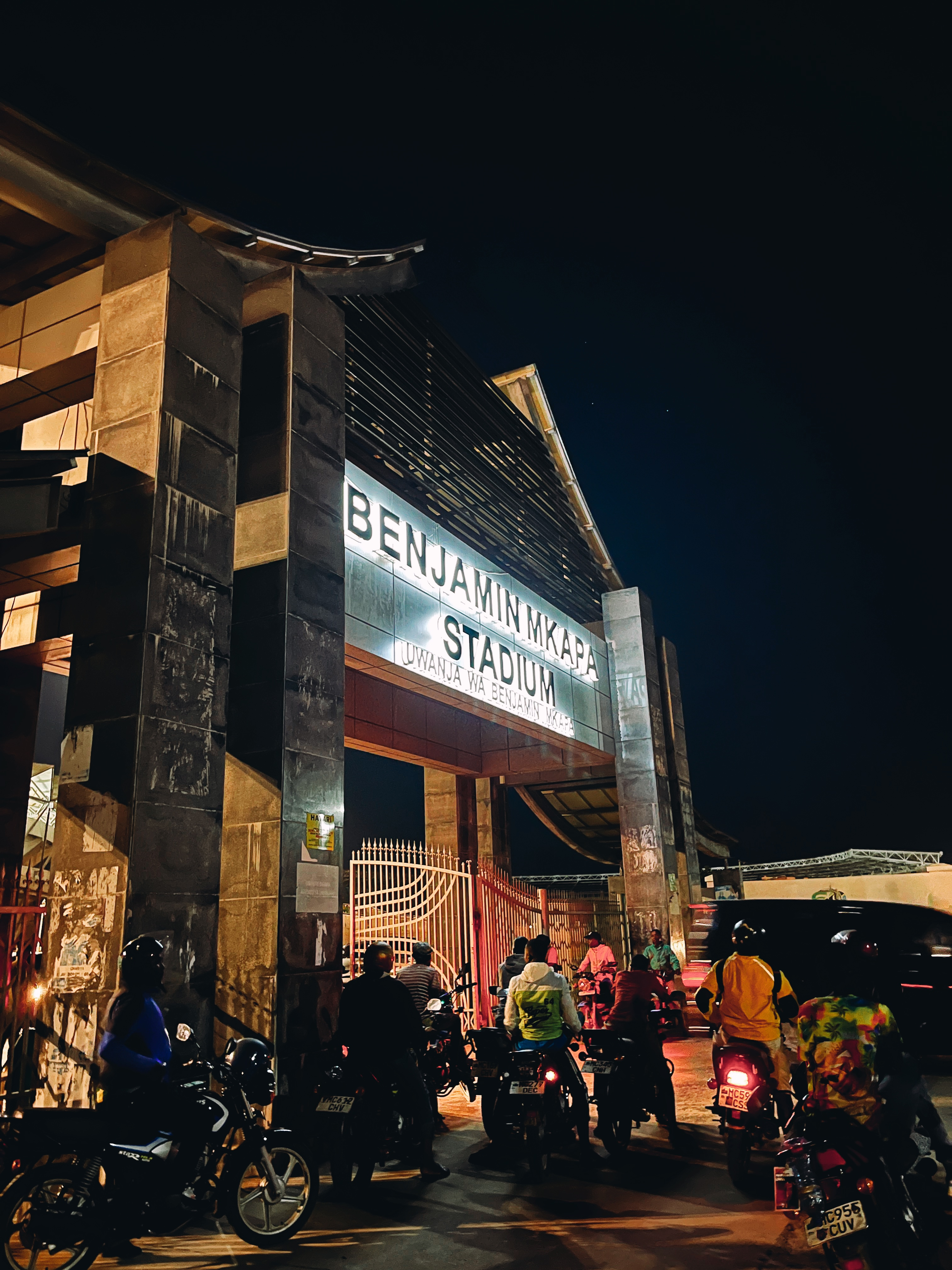
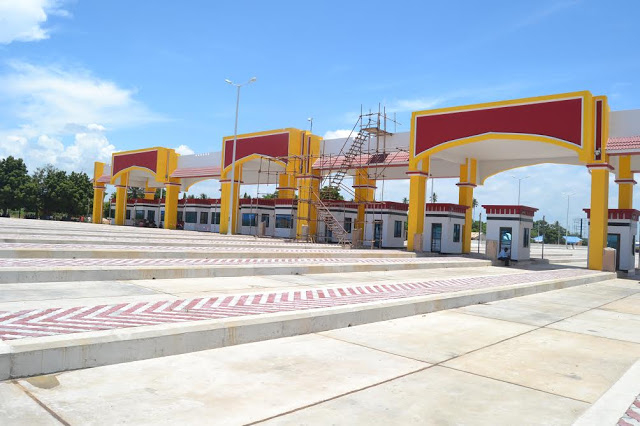
- From top to bottom: National Stadium in Miburani ward, Inside of the National stadium & Nyerere Bridge
- Nickname: Tanzania's factory
- Temeke District in Dar
- Coordinates: 6°56′55.68″S 39°36′42″E
- Country: Tanzania
- Region: Dar es Salaam Region
- District: 10 November 1999
- Named for: Temeke
- Capital: Miburani

Area
  - Total: 150.4 km^{2} (58.1 sq mi)
  - Rank: 5th in Dar
- Highest elevation (Kwembe): 225 m (738 ft)

Population (2022 census)
  - Total: 1,346,674
  - Rank: 2nd in Dar
  - Density: 8,954/km^{2} (23,190/sq mi)
- Demonym: Temekean

Ethnic groups
  - Settler: Swahili
  - Native: Zaramo
- Time zone: UTC+3 (EAT)
- Tanzanian Postcode: 151
- Website: Official website
- Symbols of Tanzania
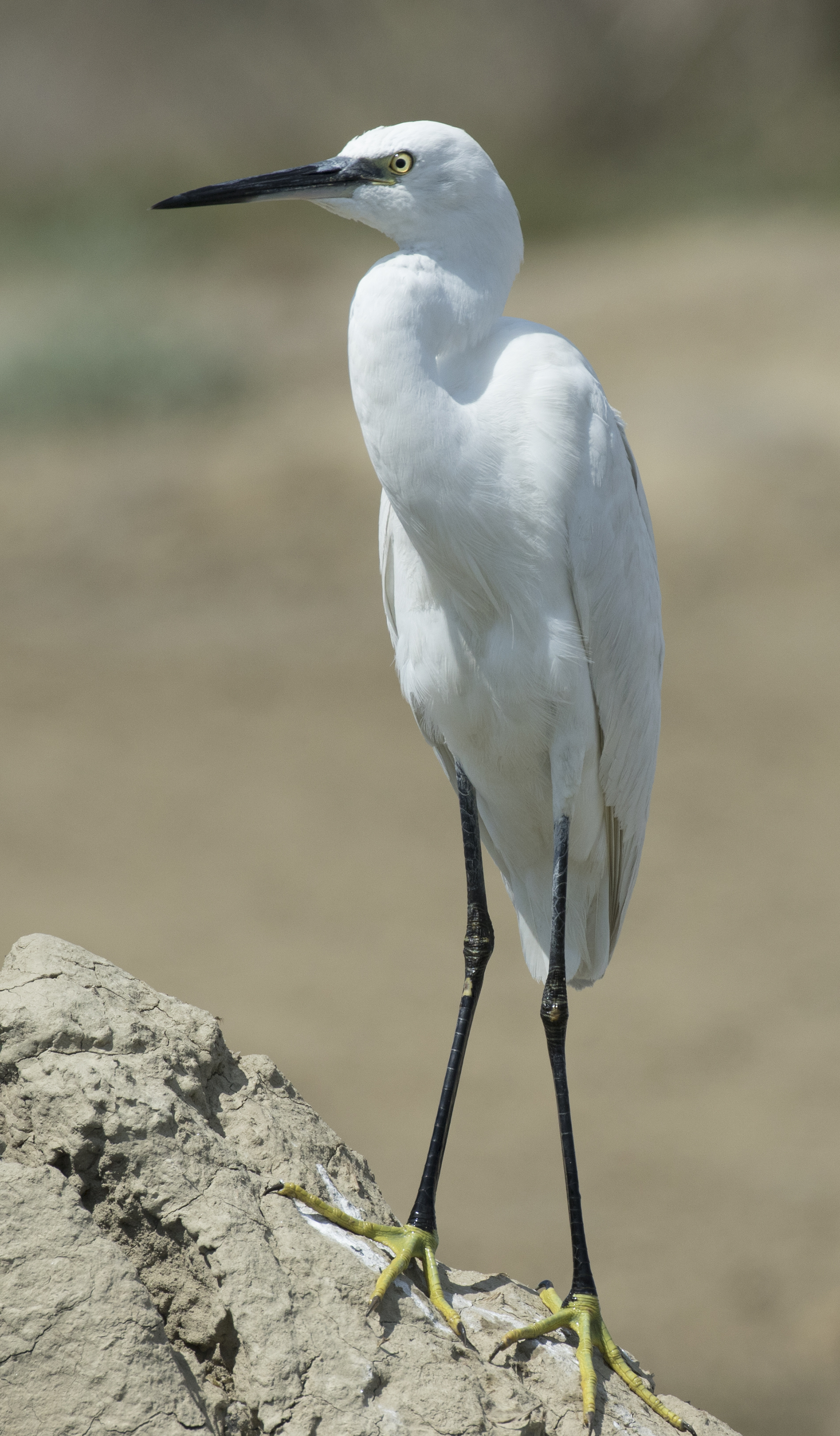
- Bird: Little egret

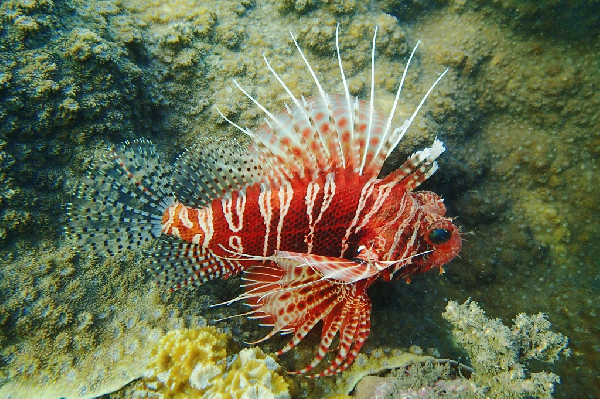
- Fish: African lionfish

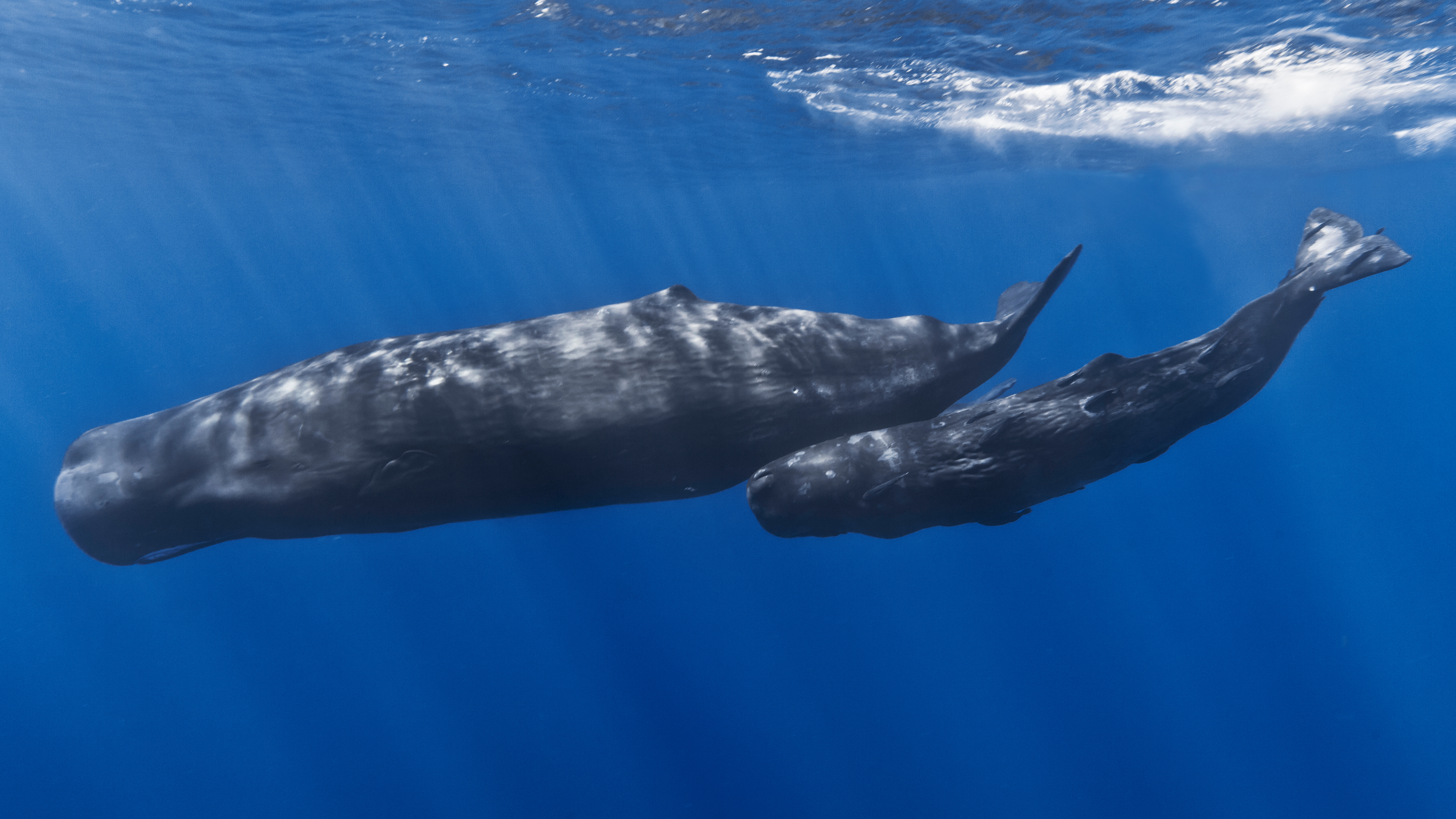
- Mammal: Sperm whale

Temeke District, officially the Temeke Municipal Council (Halimashauri ya Manispaa ya Temeke, in Swahili) is one of five districts of the Dar es Salaam Region of Tanzania. Temeke is bordered to the south by the Mkuranga District of the Pwani Region, to the north by the Indian Ocean, and to the northwest by the Ilala District. Temeke's eastern boundary is shared by Kigamboni District. The district covers an area of 150.4 km^{2} (58.1 sq mi). The district is comparable in size to the land area of Cook Islands. The administrative seat is Miburani. The district is home to the University of Dar es Salaam's School of Education, the National Stadium, the largest stadium in the country, Port of Dar es Salaam the largest port in the country, and The Chamazi Stadium the largest privately owned stadium. The 2012 National Tanzania Census states the population of the district as 1,205,949.

== Administration ==
The Temeke Municipal Council is organized into 23 wards and two divisions on an administrative level. The wards are:

- Azimio
- Buza
- Chamazi
- Chang'ombe
- Charambe
- Keko
- Kiburugwa
- Kijichi
- Kilakala
- Kurasini
- Makangarawe
- Mbagala
- Mbagala Kuu
- Mianzini
- Miburani
- Mtoni
- Sandali
- Tandika
- Temeke
- Toangoma
- Yombo Vituka

== History ==
One of the five municipalities in the City of Dar es Salaam, Temeke Municipal Council was founded on November 10, 1999, in accordance with Sections 8 and 9 of the Local Government (Urban Authorities) Act, 1982 No. 8.

== Geography ==
Temeke Municipal has a total area of 240 square kilometers, including 5 kilometers of coastline. Due to its location in Tanzania's tropical coastline region, Temeke Municipal Council is impacted by two key climatic factors: temperature and rainfall. Bimodal conventional rains accompany the bimodal type of rainfall pattern. Between December and February, the Municipality experiences nearly constant monsoon rainfall. While there were prolonged periods of severe rain from March to June. Every year, there is between 800 and 1200 mm of rainfall. Like rainfall, temperature is likewise impacted by the ocean. The entire year is marked by high temperatures, which range from 35 °C in January to March to 25 °C from June to August.

=== Topography ===
Temeke Municipal's soil is frequently clayey and partially sandy, making it relatively unproductive for agricultural usage. Alluvial soils—primarily Eutric Fluvisols and Eutric Gleysols—predominate in the river valleys, which are recent floodplains and are prone to floods. Urban soil erosion is mostly caused by the slopes of river valleys, where there is no vegetation to hold the soil in place, and is exacerbated by human activity like the extraction of building materials.

Neogene clay-bound sands to hard sandstones make up Temeke Municipal's outcropping rocks and underlying (semi-)consolidated formations. In the central and southern regions of Municipal, terrace sands and sandstones of the Quaternary System are more prevalent.

== Economy ==
=== Infrastructure ===
==== Water and Sanitation ====
The Municipality's primary water sources come from both surface sources such as the Mtoni plant and lower Ruvu (through DAWASCO pipes) and ground water sources. The current population (2018) is predicted to be 1,574,167, according to the 2002 National Population and Housing Census. The anticipated daily total water demand is 125,933m3, or 80 liters per person. Only 85.634 cubic meters per day, or 68.1% of the total needed amount, are produced at the moment as part of the water supply.

There are 232 deep boreholes owned by Temeke Municipal Council. 116 of the 232 boreholes—69 for primary schools, 23 for health centers, and 24 for secondary schools—are owned by the government. Out of 368,416 total residences, 9,516 are connected to the DAWASCO network in 13 of the 24 wards. Bore holes and shallow wells are dispersed across the Municipality in various locations. The Mtoni water treatment plant and drill holes jointly produce roughly 6.5 million gallons each day in the metropolitan regions. Boreholes in rural regions and streams in certain places yield a total of roughly 0.7 million gallons daily.

The Temeke Municipal Council is predicted to produce 1494 tons of garbage each day on average. The capacity of municipal vehicles working with private companies to collect rubbish is 964.6 tons per day, or 65% of the waste produced daily from locations within Temeke Municipal Council. The total amount of waste produced that is not collected and delivered to the disposal site is therefore 529.4 tons per day, or 35% of the total amount of waste produced each day (including recyclable wastes). Only five (5) of Temeke Municipal Council's 23 wards—Chang'ombe, Mtoni, Kurasini, Tandika, and Temeke—have private contractors that collect and transport rubbish to the landfill in Pugu Kinyamwezi on a regular basis.

==== Road and rail ====
Temeke Municipal Council maintains a network of roads totaling 628 km, of which 98.41 km are asphalt roads, 140.48 km are gravel roads, and 389.11 km are earth roads. Within the overall network of 628 km, 59 km (all paved) are under the control of TANROAD, while 575.7 km (paved-59 km, gravel-136.5 km, and earthroad-379.7 km) are under the supervision of TARURA-TEMEKE.

Temeke Municipal is located along the Central Railway Line and TAZARA Railway Line, which operate from Dar es Salaam Port and serve the nation as well as the seven (7) bordering nations of Kenya, Uganda, Malawi, Zambia, Rwanda, and Burundi. As final destinations for the railways, Kigoma, Mbeya, and Mwanza—both of which border the neighboring nations of the Democratic Republic of the Congo, Burundi, Rwanda, Uganda, Zambia, Malawi, and Kenya—could also be useful for the transportation of bulk goods.

==== Energy ====
Petroleum, hydropower, and 1% of Municipal households utilize kerosene as a lighting source for homes and small businesses are the Municipal's main sources of commercial energy. Given that the Municipal relies on the National Grid for its energy source, power outages are somewhat frequent as a result of low water levels in the hydroelectric dams. The electricity is available in all 23 of the Municipal's wards. The government, a small number of private businesses, and certain religious institutions all use solar energy.

==== Banking ====
Except for a small number of them, the Municipal has a sizable number of local banks functioning in Tanzania. The financial institutions in Tanzania have a total of 702 branches in their overall branch network, per the most recent BOT banking report.

=== Agriculture ===
In Temeke Municipal, paddy, cassava, sweet potatoes, maize, pigeon peas, cowpeas, vegetables, and fruits are the primary food crops grown. At Rufu in the Chamazi ward, the irrigation plan for the Major Agricultural Program was created. More than 325 hectares of potential irrigation land are ideal for large-scale crop cultivation. A group of 60 small-holder farmers have developed 75 of these hectares for minor irrigation. Extension officers oversee the 200 hectares of irrigation farming practiced by small holders in Temeke Municipality.

One of the activities carried out by Temeke Municipal Council is livestock keeping. There are 6,095 households that maintain animals in total. However, the space available for cattle husbandry is shrinking as a result of human settlement increase. On a modest scale, dairy cows, goats, and chickens are raised intensively. The Municipal keeps dairy cattle using a zero grazing approach. Systems that are intense and semi-intensive are used for commercial poultry raising. In the Municipality, 742 tons of broiler meat and 928,173 trays of eggs are typically produced.

There are now 30 businesses that buy, sell, process, manufacture furniture, or deal in hides or skins. The majority of animals is transferred to Pugu at Ilala for slaughter before being sold alive. A very tiny number of animals have been killed and eaten within the Municipality.

=== Trade and industry ===
Fishing, commerce, and small-scale farming are very popular in the Temeke region. It is also regarded as a manufacturing hub because it is home to the majority of Dar es Salaam's industry. Here you can also find the Dar es Salaam International Trade Fair Grounds and Tanzania's biggest port, Dar es Salaam Port, which serves six other nearby nations. The Municipal is connected to a variety of economic infrastructures, including highways, the Tanzania Railway Cooperation (TRC), Tanzania Zambia Railway (TAZARA), and maritime transportation. Temeke Municipal is connected to Dar es Salaam's city center as well as the central areas of Morogoro, Dodoma, Singida, Tabora, Mwanza, and Kigoma by the TRC infrastructure's railway line. The nation is linked to the entire East Africa Community by Mwanza and Kigoma. Currently, Temeke Municipal has 2,353 enterprises invested. 80 of these are heavy manufacturing sectors with more than 100 employees. 62 are medium-sized businesses, whereas 2,131 are small-sized businesses.

The Municipal now employs 67 commercial millers. Private persons own each one of them in large, medium, and small scale units. Since so many commodities from southern Tanzania are transported to the city for sale, the rise in flour milling businesses will encourage farmers and businesspeople to raise the price of their goods. Only 8 fruit canning and juice concentrate manufacturing industries are located in the Municipal.

Serengeti Breweries Limited (SBL) is the sole brewery that the Municipal currently has, despite the fact that the transportation industry has plenty of investment potential and sound physical infrastructure. With its own brands accounting for 15% of the market by volume and when combined with the portfolio of EABL, Serengeti Breweries Limited-SBL, Tanzania's second-largest beer company, accounts for roughly 28% of the country's branded beer market. The business was founded in 1988 under the name Associated Breweries Limited, then in 2002 it changed its name to Serengeti Breweries Limited. The SBL's main office is located in Temeke Municipal.

Over 490 businesses in the district have invested in the processing of timber, The municipal has the largest timber processing facilities in the country. They are divided into four categories: coffin making (2), sawmilling (68), and wood carving (1). There are, nevertheless, 238 businesses that produce doors, windows, and frames. The timbers (raw materials) are acquired from locations other than Temeke and Dar es Salaam, but there is sufficient supply. In Temeke Municipal, more than 2,360m3 of timber are handled each year. The Municipal actually needs about 6,000m3 of wood every year. Over 1,000 casual workers are employed in the sector, and some businesspeople are involved in the sale of lumber in the municipal market.

== Tourism and natural resources ==
The largest officially designated protected area is a mangrove forest in the municipal spans 380 hectars and is located in Temeke District in the Kurasini, Kijichi, and Mbagala Mtoni Ward. The Mwalimu J.K.Nyerere Trade Fair Grounds hosts the Dar es Salaam International Trade Fair (DITF), popularly known as Saba Saba Day, every year on the seventh of July. The Temeke Municipality is where the yearly big promotional event hosted by the Board of External Trade is situated along Kilwa Road. To lead Tanzania's export efforts, the Board of External Trade, a government entity, was founded by Act No. 5 of 1978.

One year after Tanzania declared its independence on December 9, 1961, the Trade Fair Grounds, also known as the Mwl. J. K. Nyerere Trade Fair Grounds, were opened for business. The National Agricultural and Trade Fair (NATF) was held at the Grounds, which at the time fell under the Ministry of Trade and Cooperative Unions. Over the years, the Dar es Salaam International Trade Fair has solidified its position as the showcase for goods from East, Central, and Southern Africa as well as Tanzania.

== Population ==
The Zaramo and Ndengereko minority were the district's original residents, but increasing urbanization has made Temeke one of Tanzania's most ethnically diverse districts. There is a large Makonde community in Temeke. The city had a total population of 1,205,949 as of the 2012 National Population and Housing Census, of which 587,857 were men and 618,092 were women. There were also a total of 307,760 homes, with an average size of four people per household. The annual average population growth rate was 4.6%. Temeke was expected to have 368,416 households and 1,443,629 residents as of 2016. Men make up 703,718 of them, and women make up 739,912.

== Health and education ==
=== Education ===
The Municipal contains 140 pre-primary schools and 134 primary schools, of which 2 schools and 14 units provide special education for students with various disabilities. 51 of the 134 schools are owned by the private sector, and the remaining 81 are government-run pre-primary schools. There are a total of 134 schools in total. There are 15 COBET (MEMKWA) Centers, 3 vocational centers, 2 government centers, and 1 private center, nevertheless. There are 170,027 pupils enrolled in public and private pre-primary and primary schools overall.

The Municipal has 63 secondary schools in total. wherein there are 37 private secondary schools and 26 public ones. As shown in figure 8 below, there are presently 52,161 pupils enrolled in the Municipal (in both private and public schools), with 25,347 boys and 26,814 girls.

=== Health ===
There are currently 136 medical facilities in existence, of which 3 are hospitals, 16 are health centers, and 102 are dispensaries. The largest one being the Temeke Regional Referral Hospital located in Temeke ward.

== Notable people ==
- Marioo, socialite
