= Vingunguti =

Ward of Ilala District, Dar es Salaam Region

Vingunguti Kata ya Vingunguti (Swahili)
- Ward of Ilala District
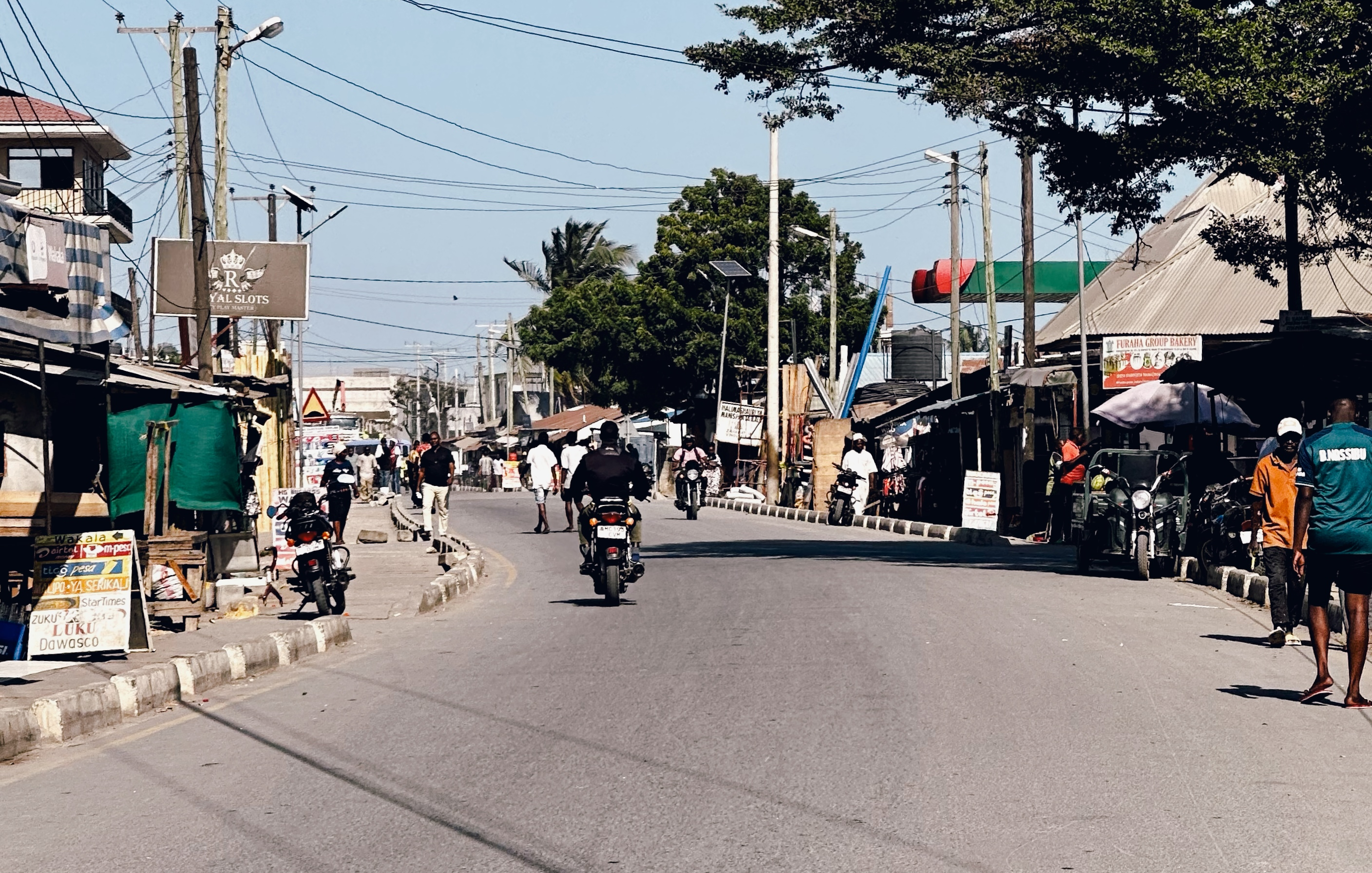
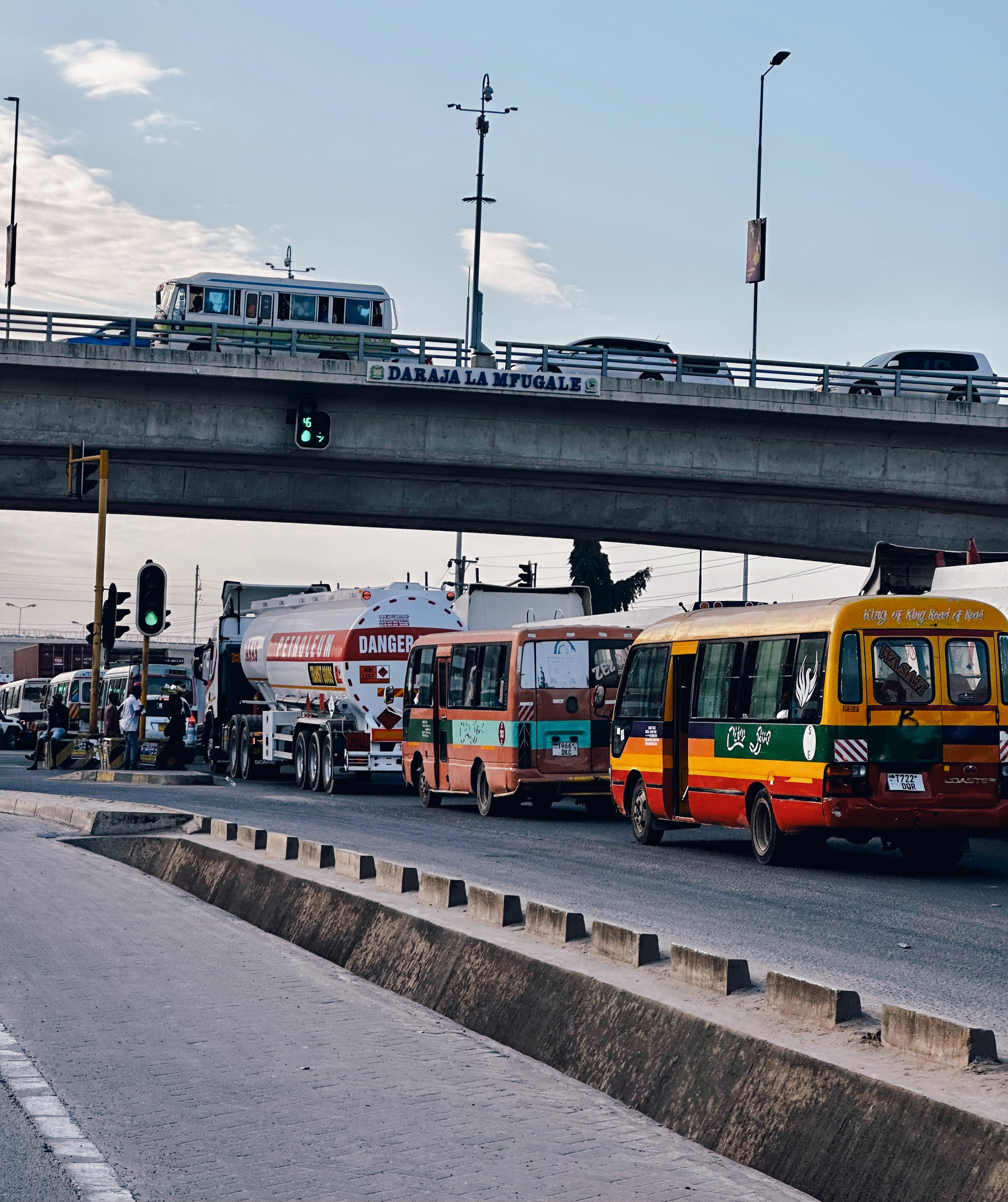
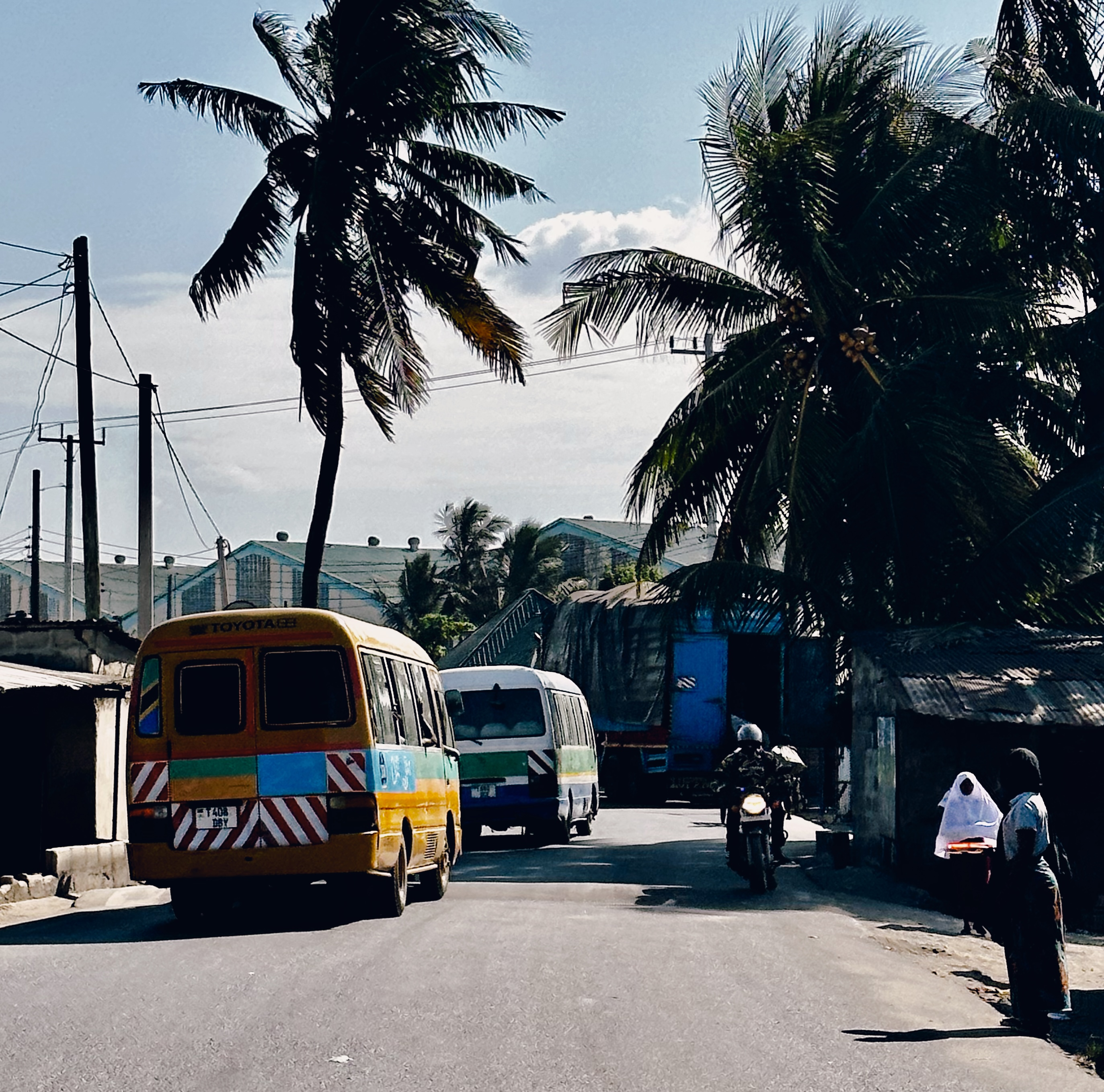
- From top to bottom
- Interactive map of Vingunguti
- Coordinates: 6°50′43.8″S 39°13′30.36″E
- Country: Tanzania
- Region: Dar es Salaam Region
- District: Ilala District

Area
  - Total: 4.4 km^{2} (1.7 sq mi)

Population (2012)
  - Total: 106,946

Ethnic groups
  - Settler: Swahili
  - Ancestral: Zaramo
- Tanzanian Postal Code: 12109

Vingunguti (Kata ya Vingunguti, in Swahili) is an administrative ward of the Ilala Municipical Council of the Dar es Salaam Region in Tanzania. Kiwalani, Sandali, and Temeke, the latter two in Temeke MC, form the ward's southern border. The ward is bounded by Tabata to the north and Buguruni to the east. Segerea and Kipawa wards border the ward on its western side. The largest tea-producing facility in the nation, Chai Bora, is located within Vingunguti. According to the 2012 census, the ward has a total population 106,946.

== Administration ==
The postal code for the Vingunguti ward is 12109. The ward is divided into the following neighborhoods (Mitaa):

- Butiama
- Kombo
- Majengo, Vingunguti

- Miembeni, Vingunguti
- Matakuja
- Mtambani

=== Government ===
Like every other ward in the country, the ward has local government offices based on the population served. The Vingunguti Ward administration building houses a court as per the Ward Tribunal Act of 1988, including other vital departments for the administration of the ward. The ward has the following administration offices:

- Vingunguti Police Station
- Vingunguti Government Office (Afisa Mtendaji)
- Vingunguti Ward Tribunal (Baraza La Kata) is a Department inside Ward Government Office

In the local government system of Tanzania, the ward is the smallest democratic unit. Each ward comprises a committee of eight elected council members, including a chairperson, one salaried officer (with no voting rights), and an executive officer. One-third of seats are reserved for women councillors.

== History ==
When there were two neighborhoods at the time, Wapendanao (Kombo) and Mtambani, long trees called Minguti in Kizaramo at the time gave rise to the name Vingunguti. Due to the addition of Mtakuja and Miembeni to the list, the Neighborhoods were expanded from two to four in 1980. As of 2012, there are six neighborhoods in the ward. The first health center in the area was Mlawa Dispensary, which opened in the 1990s close to the Miembeni area. The name derives from Dr. Mlawa, a Vingunguti resident and a physician at Muhimbili Referral Hospital (formerly Muhimbili National Hospital.

== Demographics ==
The ward and much of the district serve as the Zaramo people's ancestral home. As the city developed over time, the ward became a cosmopolitan ward. In total, 106,946 people called the ward home in 2012.

== Education and health ==
=== Education ===
The ward is home to these educational institutions

- Kombo Primary School
- Vingunguti "A" Primary School
- Vingunguti Secondary School
- St. Joseph Benedict Cottolego Primary School

=== Healthcare ===
The ward is home to the following health institutions:

- Vingunguti (Mlawa) Health Center
- Emara Dispensary
- Tayma Dispensary
- Afya Bora Dispensary
