= Sandali =

Ward of Temeke District, Dar es Salaam Region

Sandali Kata ya Sandali (Swahili)
- Ward of Temeke District
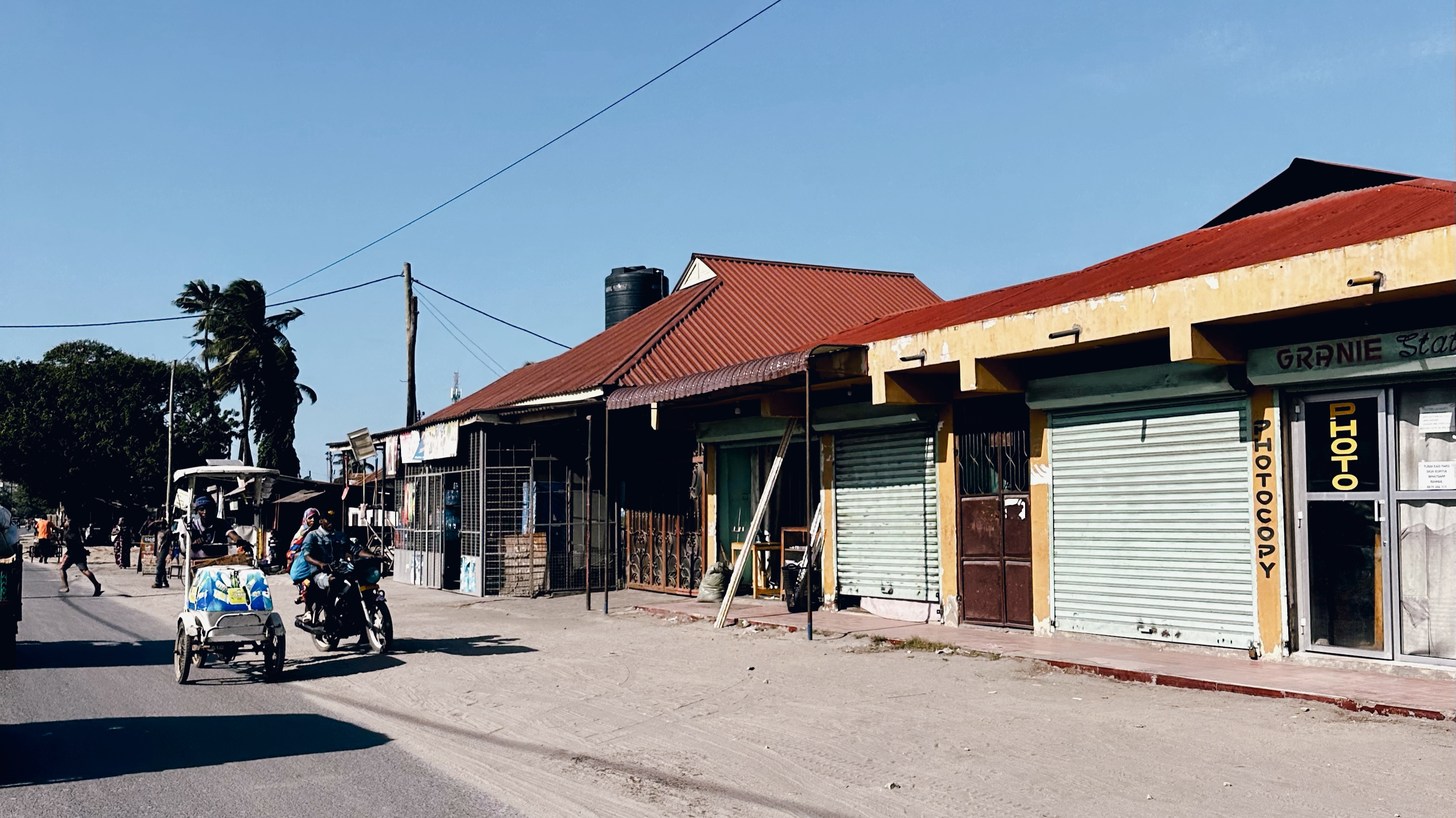
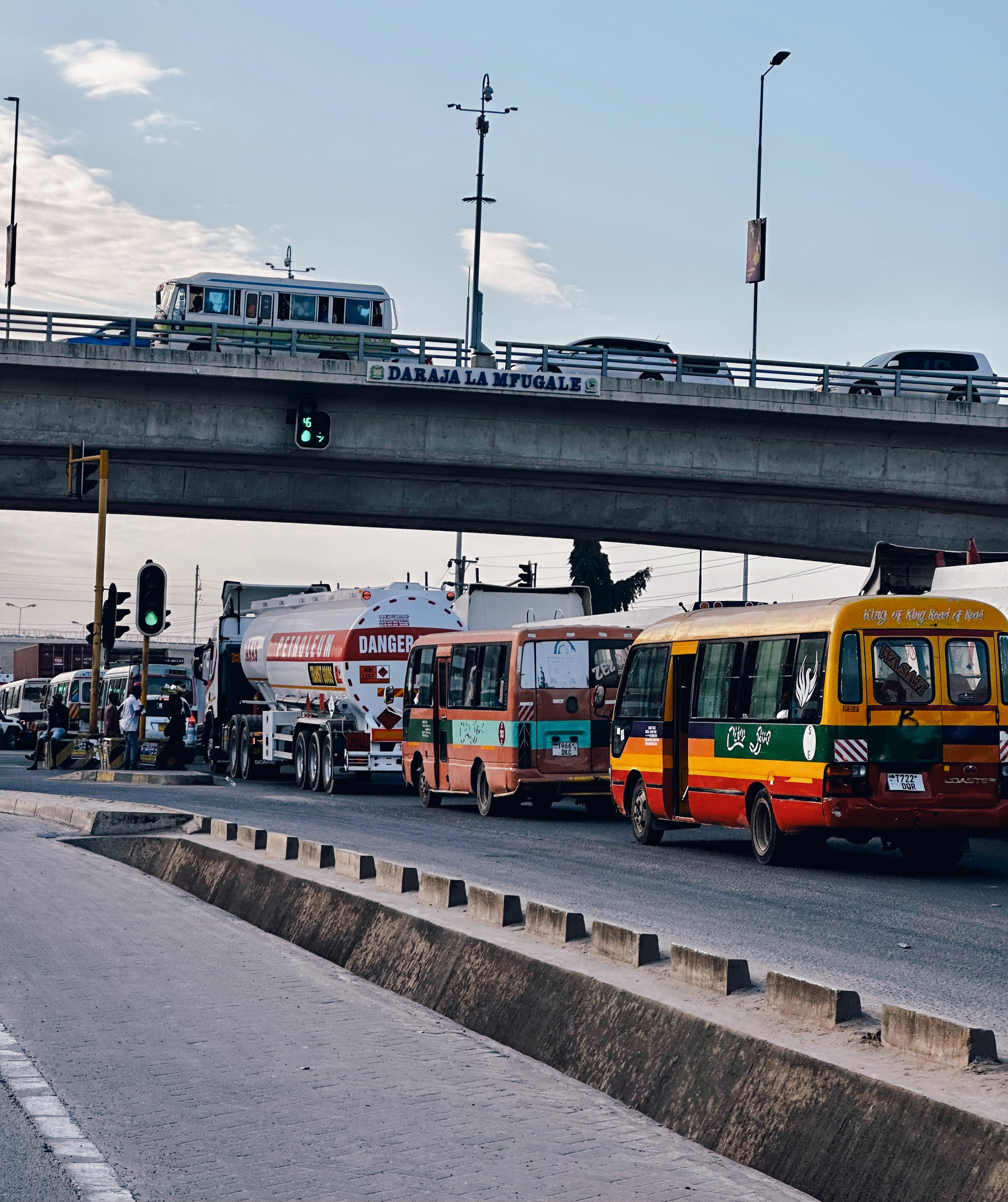
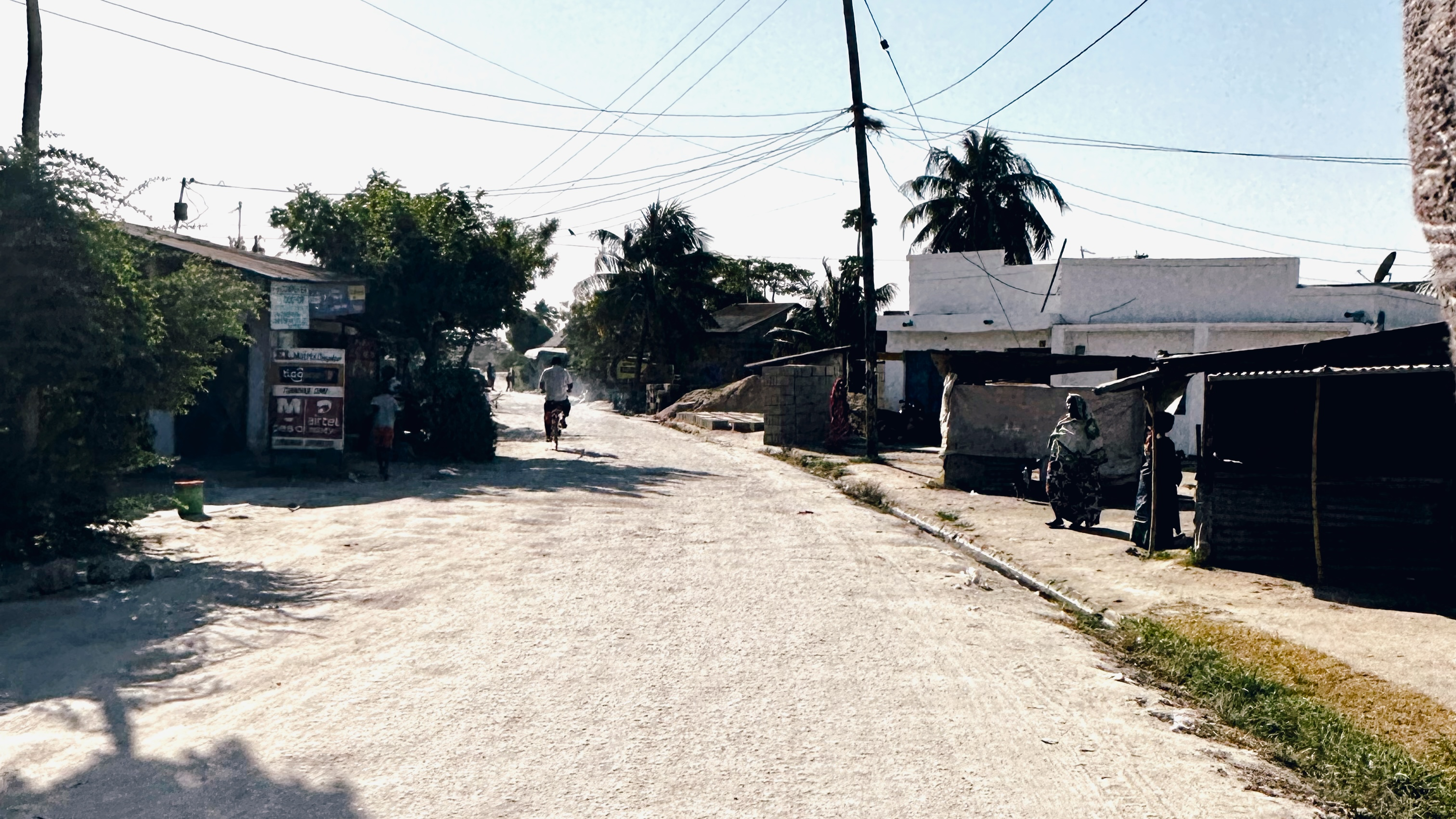
- From top to bottom: Street in Sandali, Bridge separating Vingunguti, Temeke and Sandali & unpaved street in Sandali
- Interactive map of Sandali
- Coordinates: 6°52′27″S 39°15′41″E
- Country: Tanzania
- Region: Dar es Salaam Region
- District: Temeke District

Area
  - Total: 3.9 km^{2} (1.5 sq mi)

Population (2012)
  - Total: 59,378

Ethnic groups
  - Settler: Swahili
  - Ancestral: Zaramo
- Tanzanian Postal Code: 15102

Sandali (Kata ya Sandali , in Swahili) is an administrative ward in the Temeke district of the Dar es Salaam Region of Tanzania. Kurasini forms the northern boundary of the ward. the west are the wards of Ilala MC, Vingunguti and Kiwalani. Temeke forms the eastern boundary of the ward. Kilakala and Tandika form the ward's southern boundary. According to the 2012 census, the ward has a total population of 59,378.

== Administration ==
The postal code for Sandali Ward is 15102. The ward is divided into the following neighborhoods (Mitaa):

- Kimbunga
- Kisiwani
- Mamboleo "A"
- Mamboleo "B"
- Mkwida
- Mpogo

- Mwembeladu
- Mwembemnofu
- Sandali
- Tindwa
- Usalama
- Veterinary

=== Government ===
Like every other ward in the country, the ward has local government offices based on the population served. The Sandali Ward administration building houses a court as per the Ward Tribunal Act of 1988, including other vital departments for the administration of the ward. The ward has the following administration offices:

- Sandali Police Station (Kituo cha Polisi)
- Sandali Government Office ( Ofisi ya Afisa Mtendaji wa Kata)
- Sandali Tribunal (Baraza La Kata) is a Department inside Ward Government Office

In the local government system of Tanzania, the ward is the smallest democratic unit. Each ward comprises a committee of eight elected council members, including a chairperson, one salaried officer (with no voting rights), and an executive officer. One-third of seats are reserved for women councilors.

== Demographics ==
The ward serves as the Zaramo people's ancestral home, along with much of the district. As the city developed over time, the ward became a cosmopolitan ward with a population of 59,378 as of 2012.

== Education and health ==
=== Education ===
The ward is home to these educational institutions:

- Sandali Primary School
- An Nujum Madrasat

=== Healthcare ===
The ward is home to the following health institutions:

- Sandali Health Center
- Tyma Sandali Health Center
- MICO Sandali Health Centre
