= Temeke, Temeke District =

Ward of Temeke District, Dar es Salaam Region

Temeke Kata ya Temeke (Swahili)
- Ward of Temeke District
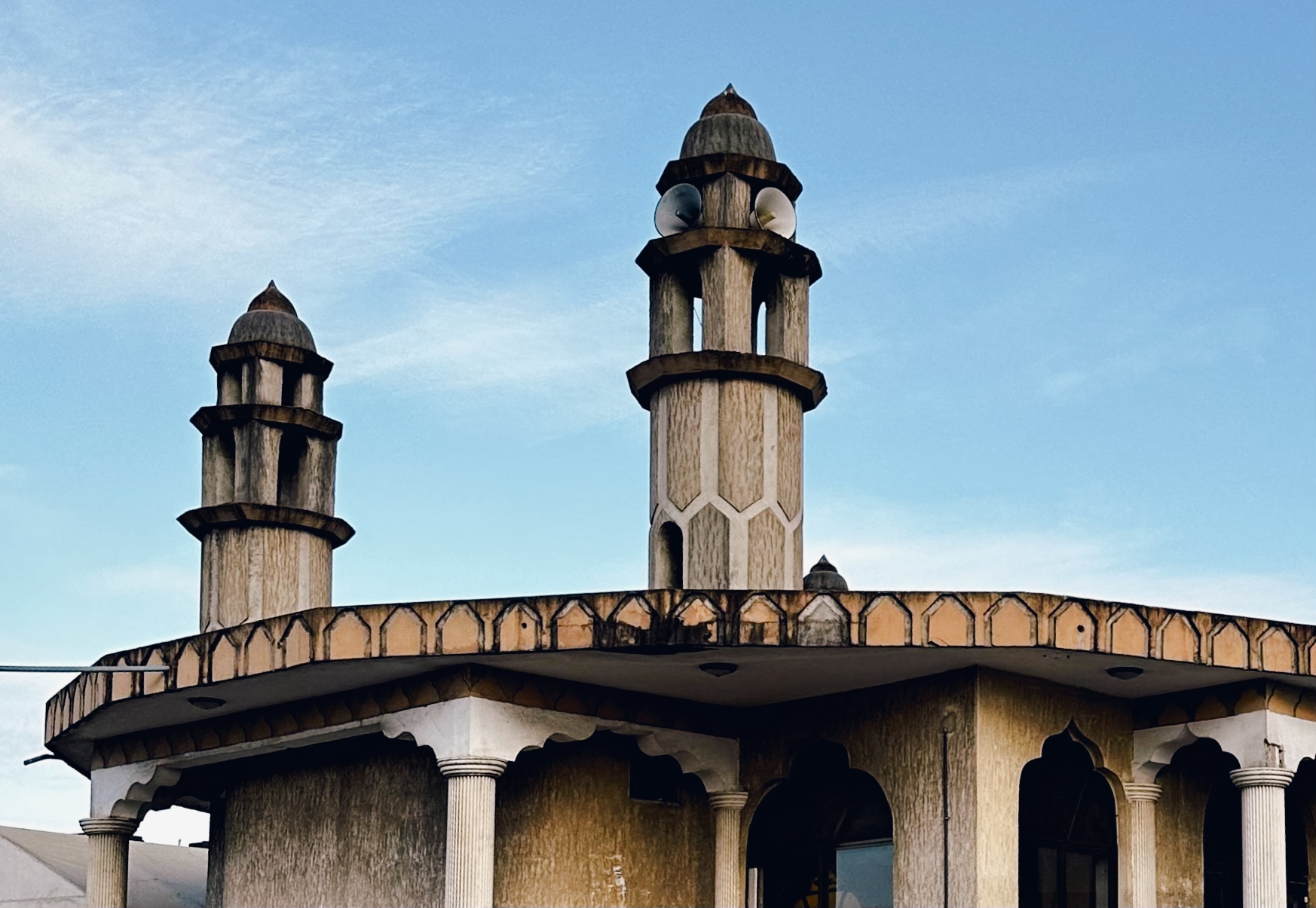
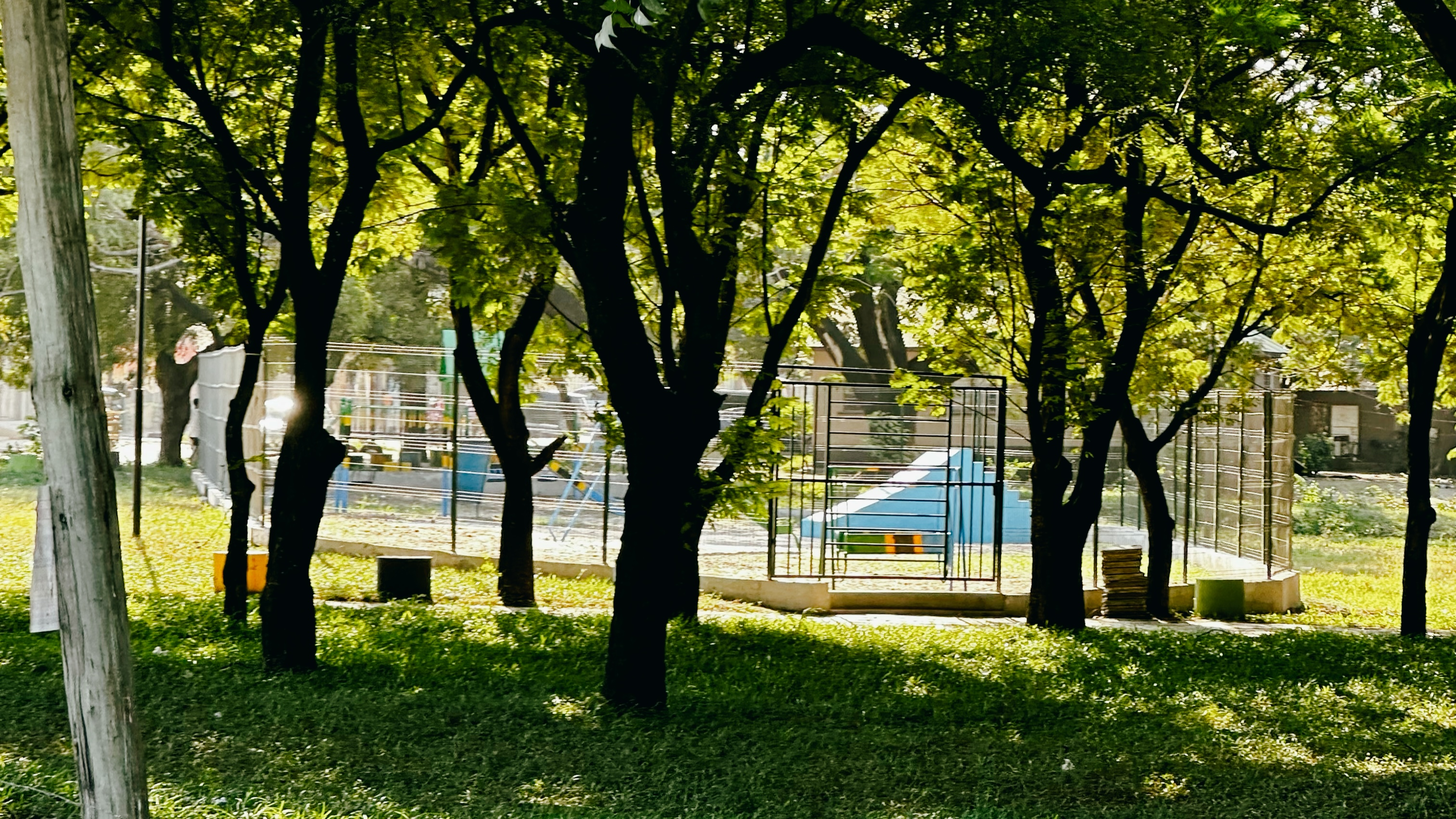
- From top to bottom: Old Mosque in Temeke, apartment in Temeke and Mwembeyanga Park in Temeke
- Interactive map of Temeke
- Coordinates: 6°51′50.04″S 39°15′48.78″E
- Country: Tanzania
- Region: Dar es Salaam Region
- District: Temeke District

Area
  - Total: 2.9 km^{2} (1.1 sq mi)

Population (2012)
  - Total: 26,047

Ethnic groups
  - Settler: Swahili
  - Ancestral: Zaramo
- Tanzanian Postal Code: 15101

Temeke (Kata ya Temeke , in Swahili) is an administrative ward in the Temeke district of the Dar es Salaam Region of Tanzania. In the north, the ward is bounded by the Buguruni and Vingunguti of Ilala MC. Sandali, borders the west. Chang'ombe forms the ward's eastern boundary. The ward's southern boundaries are formed by Miburani, Azimio, and Tandika. According to the 2012 census, the ward has a total population of 49,491.

== Administration ==
The postal code for Temeke Ward is 15101. The ward is divided into the following neighborhoods (Mitaa):

- Maganga
- Matumbi

- Njaro
- Temeke

=== Government ===
Like every other ward in the country, the ward has local government offices based on the population served. The Temeke Ward administration building houses a court as per the Ward Tribunal Act of 1988, including other vital departments for the administration of the ward. The ward has the following administration offices:

- Temeke Police Station (Kituo cha Polisi)
- Temeke Government Office ( Ofisi ya Afisa Mtendaji wa Kata)
- Temeke Tribunal (Baraza La Kata) is a Department inside Ward Government Office

In the local government system of Tanzania, the ward is the smallest democratic unit. Each ward comprises a committee of eight elected council members, including a chairperson, one salaried officer (with no voting rights), and an executive officer. One-third of seats are reserved for women councilors.

== Demographics ==
The ward serves as the Zaramo people's ancestral home, along with much of the district. As the city developed over time, the ward became a cosmopolitan ward with a population of 26,047 as of 2012.

== Education and health ==
=== Education ===
The ward is home to these educational institutions:

- Temeke Primary School
- Madenge Primary School
- Al-hikma English Primary School
- Al-hikma Girl's Secondary
- Tandika Secondary School

=== Healthcare ===
The ward is home to the following health institutions:

- Arafa Upendo Health Center, Temeke
- Temeke Regional Hospital
- Masawe Health Centre
- Temeke Dispensary
