= Kilakala =

Ward of Temeke District, Dar es Salaam Region

Kilakala Kata ya Kilakala (Swahili)
- Ward of Temeke District
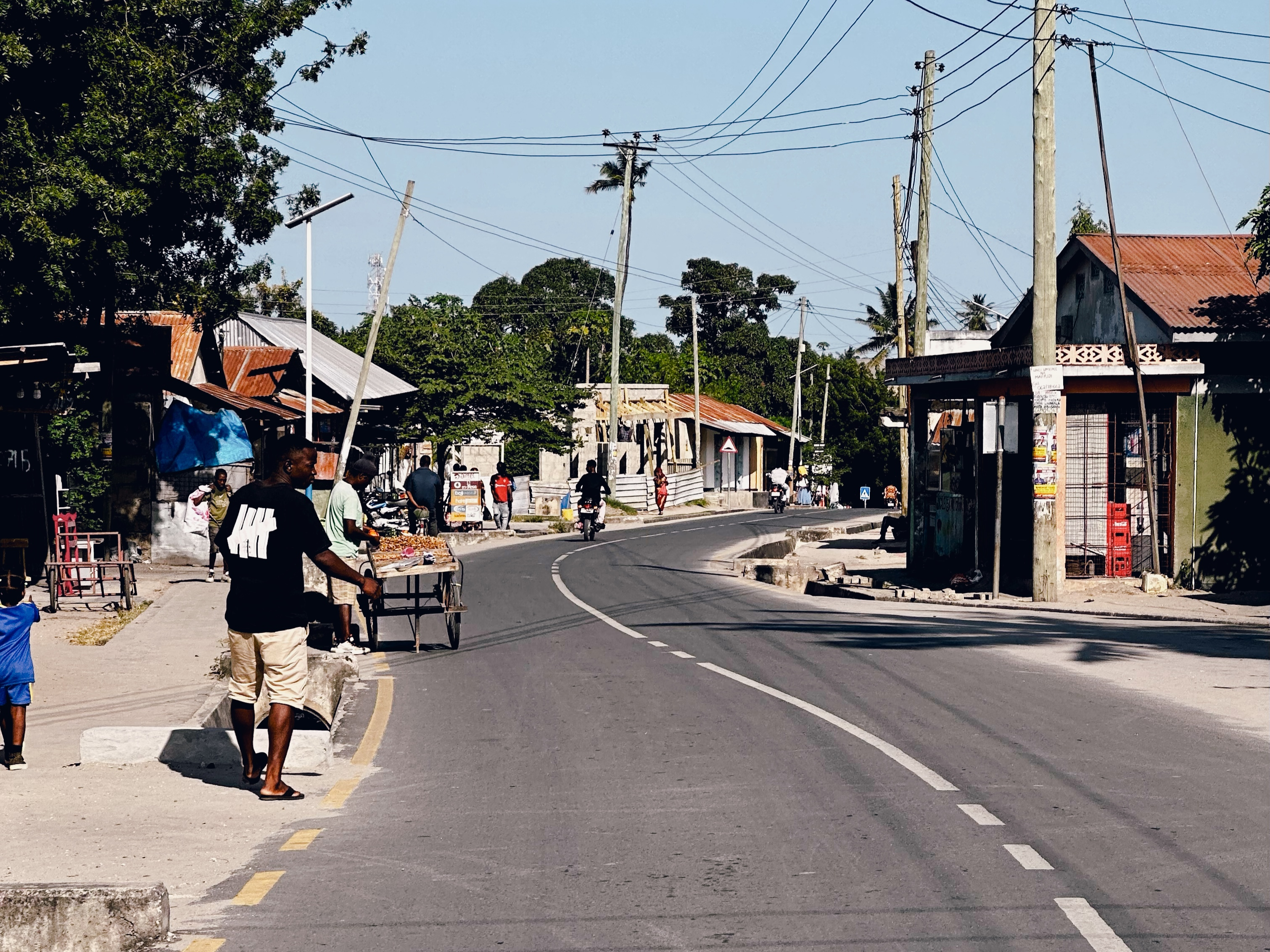
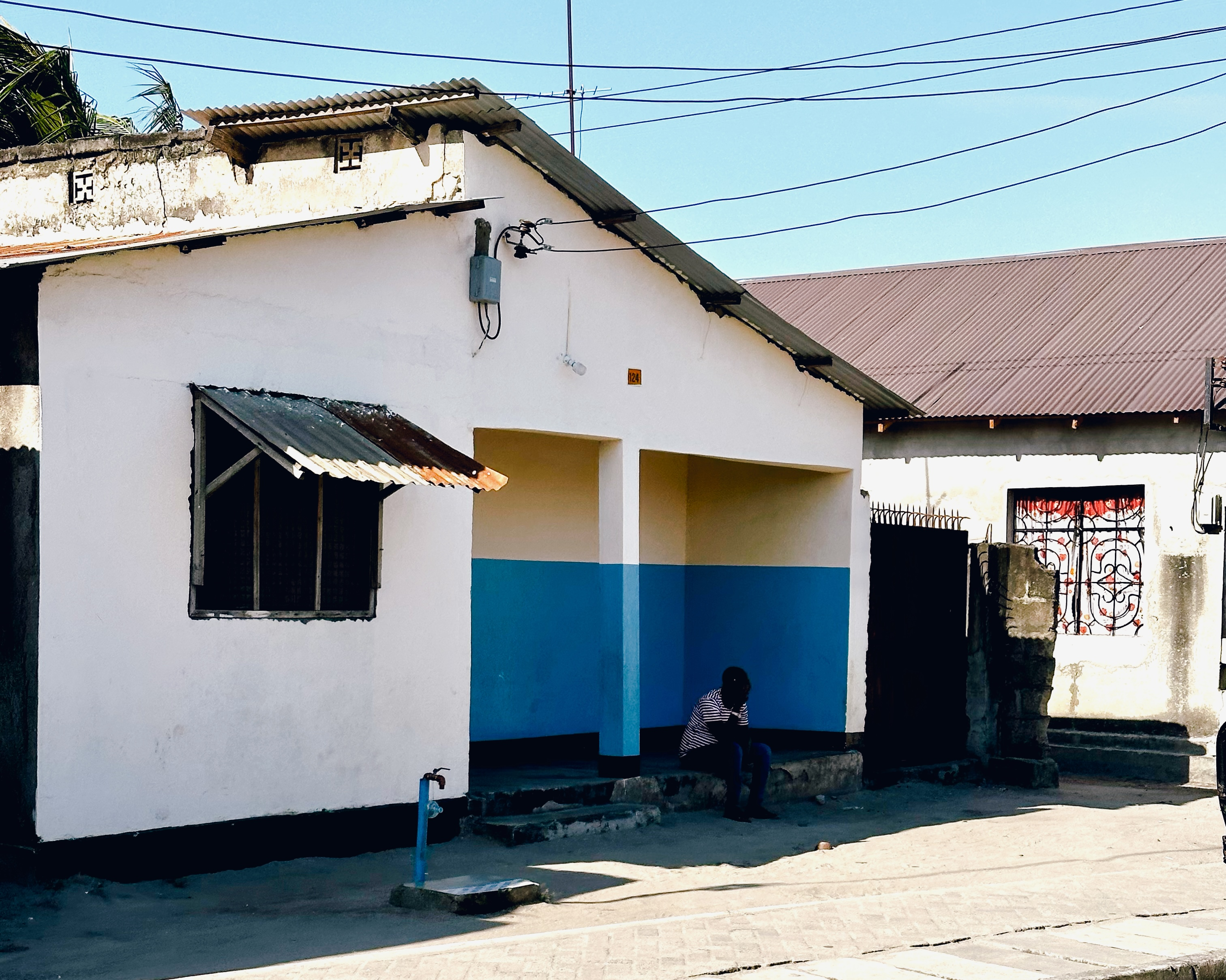
- From top to bottom: Street in Kilakala, House in Kilakala ward
- Interactive map of Kilakala
- Coordinates: 6°49′46.2″S 37°41′2.04″E
- Country: Tanzania
- Region: Dar es Salaam Region
- District: Temeke District

Area
  - Total: 1.5 km^{2} (0.58 sq mi)

Population (2012)
  - Total: 44,949
- Demonym: Kilakalan

Ethnic groups
  - Settler: Swahili
  - Ancestral: Zaramo
- Tanzanian Postal Code: 15127

Kilakala (Kata ya Kilakala, in Swahili) is an administrative ward in the Temeke district of the Dar es Salaam Region of Tanzania. The ward is bounded to the east by the wards of Sandali and Tandika. Makangarawe forms the southern boundary of Kilakala. The ward is bordered to the west by Yombo Vituka, and to the north by Kiwalani ward in the Ilala District. According to the 2012 census, the ward has a total population of 44,949.

== Administration ==
The postal code for Kilakala Ward is 15127. The ward is divided into the following neighborhoods (Mitaa):

- Barababra ya Mwinyi, Kilakala
- Kiembesamaki
- Kigunga

- Kilakala
- Yombo Reli

=== Government ===
Like every other ward in the country, the ward has local government offices based on the population served. The Kilakala Ward administration building houses a court as per the Ward Tribunal Act of 1988, including other vital departments for the administration of the ward. The ward has the following administration offices:

- Kilakala Ward Police Station
- Kilakala Ward Government Office (Afisa Mtendaji)
- Kilakala Ward Tribunal (Baraza La Kata) is a Department inside Ward Government Office

In the local government system of Tanzania, the ward is the smallest democratic unit. Each ward comprises a committee of eight elected council members, including a chairperson, one salaried officer (with no voting rights), and an executive officer. One-third of seats are reserved for women councilors.

== Demographics ==
The ward serves as the Zaramo ancestral home along with a sizable chunk of the district. The ward changed over time as the city grew, becoming a cosmopolitan ward.

== Education and health ==
=== Education ===
The ward is home to these educational institutions:

- Kilakala Primary School

=== Healthcare ===
The ward is home to the following health institutions:

- Arafa Kilakala Health Center
- Mico Kilakala Health Center
- Yombo Kilakala Dispensary
