= Buguruni =

Ward of Ilala District, Dar es Salaam Region

Buguruni Kata ya Buguruni (Swahili)
- Ward of Ilala District
- From top to bottom
- Interactive map of Buguruni
- Coordinates: 6°50′20.04″S 39°14′37.32″E
- Country: Tanzania
- Region: Dar es Salaam Region
- District: Ilala District

Area
  - Total: 3.4 km^{2} (1.3 sq mi)

Population (2022)
  - Total: 47,278

Ethnic groups
  - Settler: Swahili
  - Ancestral: Zaramo
- Tanzanian Postal Code: 12102

Buguruni (Kata ya Buguruni, in Swahili) is an administrative ward of the Ilala Municipical Council of the Dar es Salaam Region in Tanzania. The Kigogo ward of Kinondoni MC borders the ward to the north. The ward is bordered to the east by the Ilala ward. By Temeke MC's Chang'ombe and Temeke wards to the south. Vingunguti and Tabata wards border the ward to the west. According to the 2022 census, the ward has a total population of 47,278.

== Administration ==
The postal code for the Buguruni ward is 12102. The ward is divided into the following neighborhoods (Mitaa):

- Kisiwani, Buguruni
- Madenge
- Malapa
- Mvinjeni

=== Government ===
The ward, like every other ward in the country, has local government offices based on the population served.The Buguruni Ward administration building houses a court as per the Ward Tribunal Act of 1988, including other vital departments for the administration the ward. The ward has the following administration offices:

- Buguruni Police Station
- Buguruni Government Office (Afisa Mtendaji)
- Buguruni Ward Tribunal (Baraza La Kata) is a Department inside Ward Government Office

In the local government system of Tanzania, the ward is the smallest democratic unit. Each ward is composed of a committee of eight elected council members which include a chairperson, one salaried officer (with no voting rights), and an executive officer. One-third of seats are reserved for women councillors.

== Demographics ==
The ward serves as the Zaramo people's ancestral home, along with much of the district. As the city developed throughout time, the ward became into a cosmopolitan ward. In total, 47,278 people called the ward home in 2022, with 23,746 (50.22%) males and 23,532 females (49.78%).

== Education and health ==
=== Education ===
The ward is home to these educational institutions

- Buguruni Primary School
- Buguruni Kisiwani Primary School
- Hekima Primary School
- Buguruni Viziwi Primary School
- Al-furqaan Primary School
- St. John's University of Tanzania- St. Marks's Campus, Buguruni

=== Healthcare ===
The ward is home to the following health institutions:

- Arafa Dispensary
- Buguruni Anglican Health Center
- Buguruni Health Center
