= Yombo Vituka =

Ward of Temeke District, Dar es Salaam Region

Yombo Vituka Kata ya Yombo Vituka (Swahili)
- Ward of Temeke District
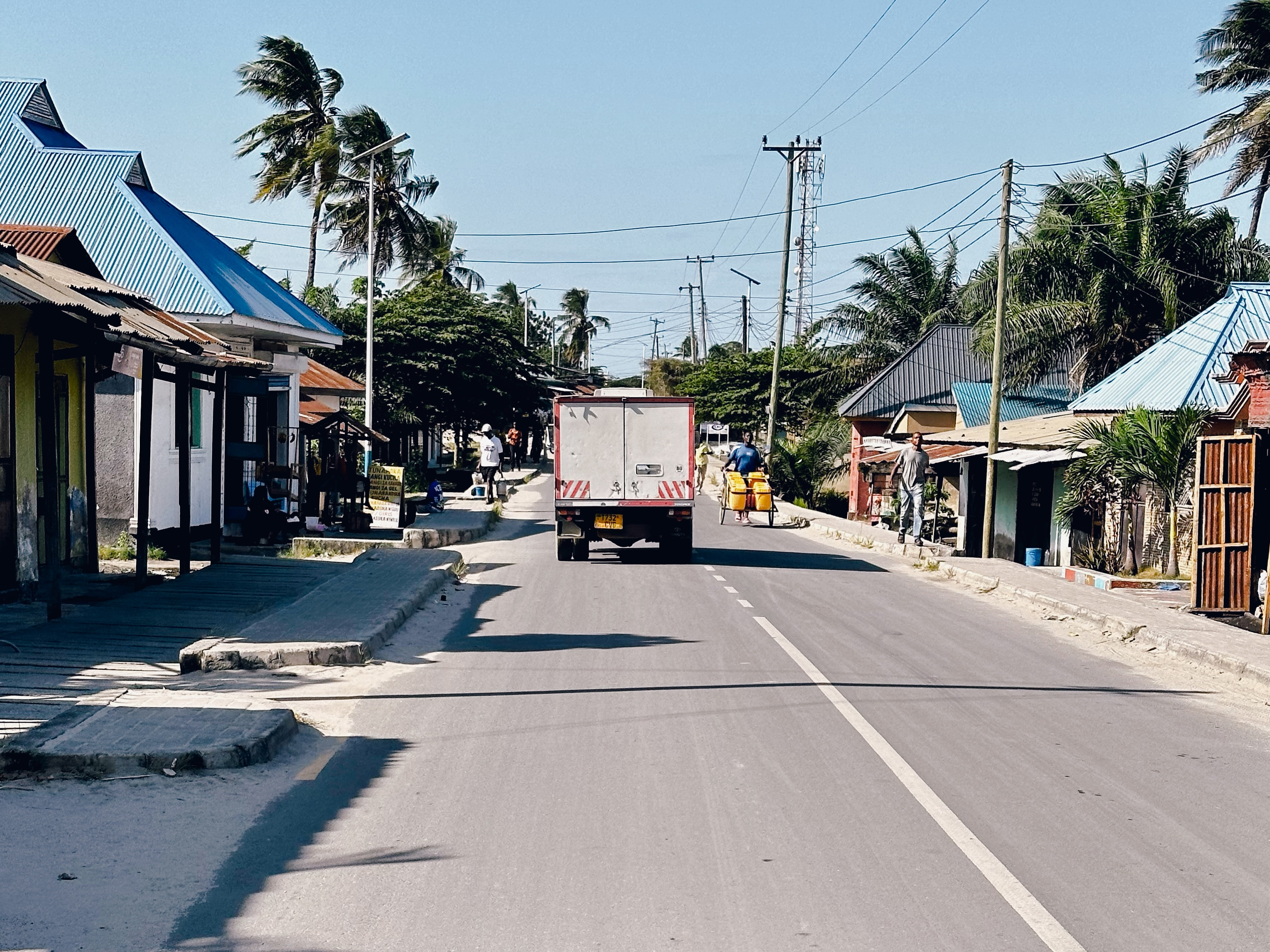
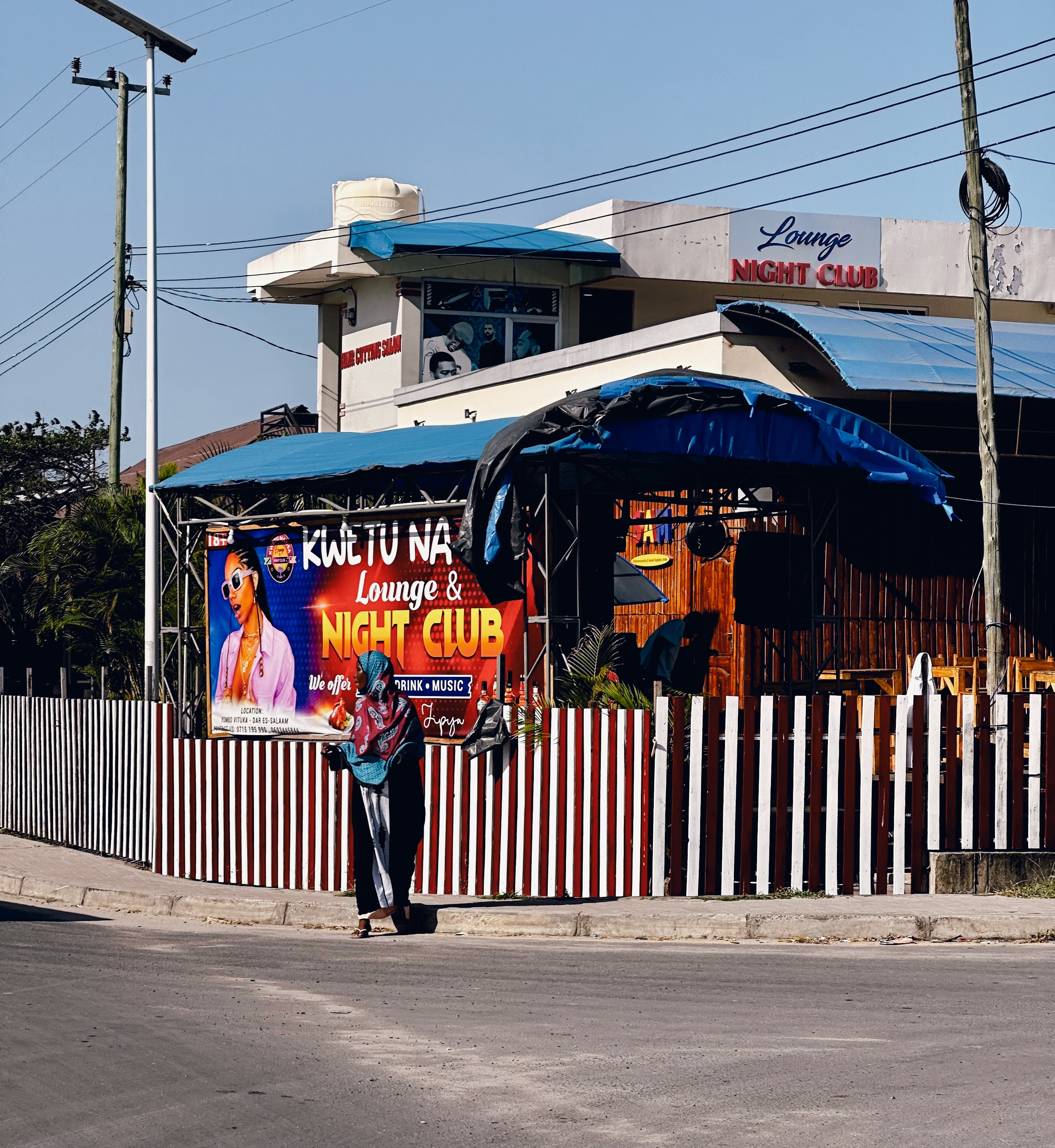
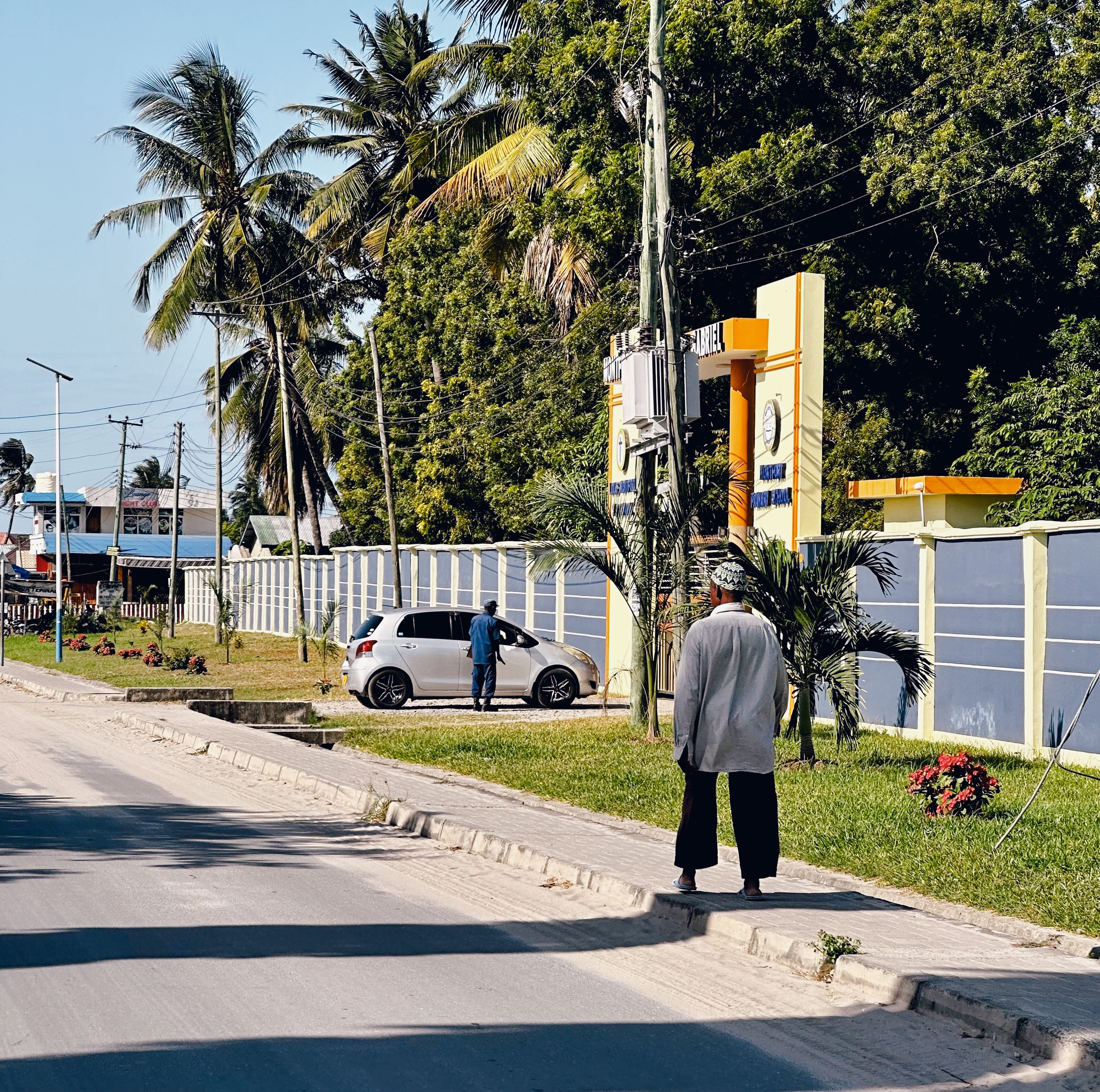
- From top to bottom: Street in Yombo Vituka, Nightclub in Yombo Vituka and Street scene in Yombo Vituka
- Interactive map of Yombo Vituka
- Coordinates: 6°50′59.64″S 39°14′43.08″E
- Country: Tanzania
- Region: Dar es Salaam Region
- District: Temeke District

Area
  - Total: 5.5 km^{2} (2.1 sq mi)

Population (2012)
  - Total: 76,999

Ethnic groups
  - Settler: Swahili
  - Ancestral: Zaramo
- Tanzanian Postal Code: 15115

Yombo Vituka (Kata ya Yombo Vituka , in Swahili) is an administrative ward in the Temeke district of the Dar es Salaam Region of Tanzania. The Kiwalani of Ilala MC forms the ward's northern boundary. Ilala MC's Kipawa and Kitunda are to the west. The ward is bounded to the east by Kilakala and Makangarawe. The ward is bordered with Buza to the south. According to the 2012 census, the ward has a total population of 76,999.

== Administration ==
The postal code for Toangoma Ward is 15115. The ward is divided into the following neighborhoods (Mitaa):

- Machimbo
- Magogoni
- Mizambarauni
- Sigara
- Yombo Vituka

=== Government ===
Like every other ward in the country, the ward has local government offices based on the population served. The Yombo Vituka Ward administration building houses a court as per the Ward Tribunal Act of 1988, including other vital departments for the administration of the ward. The ward has the following administration offices:

- Yombo Vituka Police Station (Kituo cha Polisi)
- Yombo Vituka Government Office ( Ofisi ya Afisa Mtendaji wa Kata)
- Yombo Vituka Tribunal (Baraza La Kata) is a Department inside Ward Government Office

In the local government system of Tanzania, the ward is the smallest democratic unit. Each ward comprises a committee of eight elected council members, including a chairperson, one salaried officer (with no voting rights), and an executive officer. One-third of seats are reserved for women councilors.

== Demographics ==
The ward serves as the Zaramo people's ancestral home, along with much of the district. As the city developed over time, the ward became a cosmopolitan ward with a population of 76,999 as of 2012.

== Education and health ==
=== Education ===
The ward is home to these educational institutions:

- Yombo vituka Primary School

=== Healthcare ===
The ward is home to the following health institutions:

- Mico Health Center, Yombo Vituka
- Yombo Vituka Health Center
- SPRF Health Centre
