= Azimio =

Ward of Temeke District, Dar es Salaam Region, Tanzania

Azimio Kata ya Azimio (Swahili)
- Ward of Temeke District
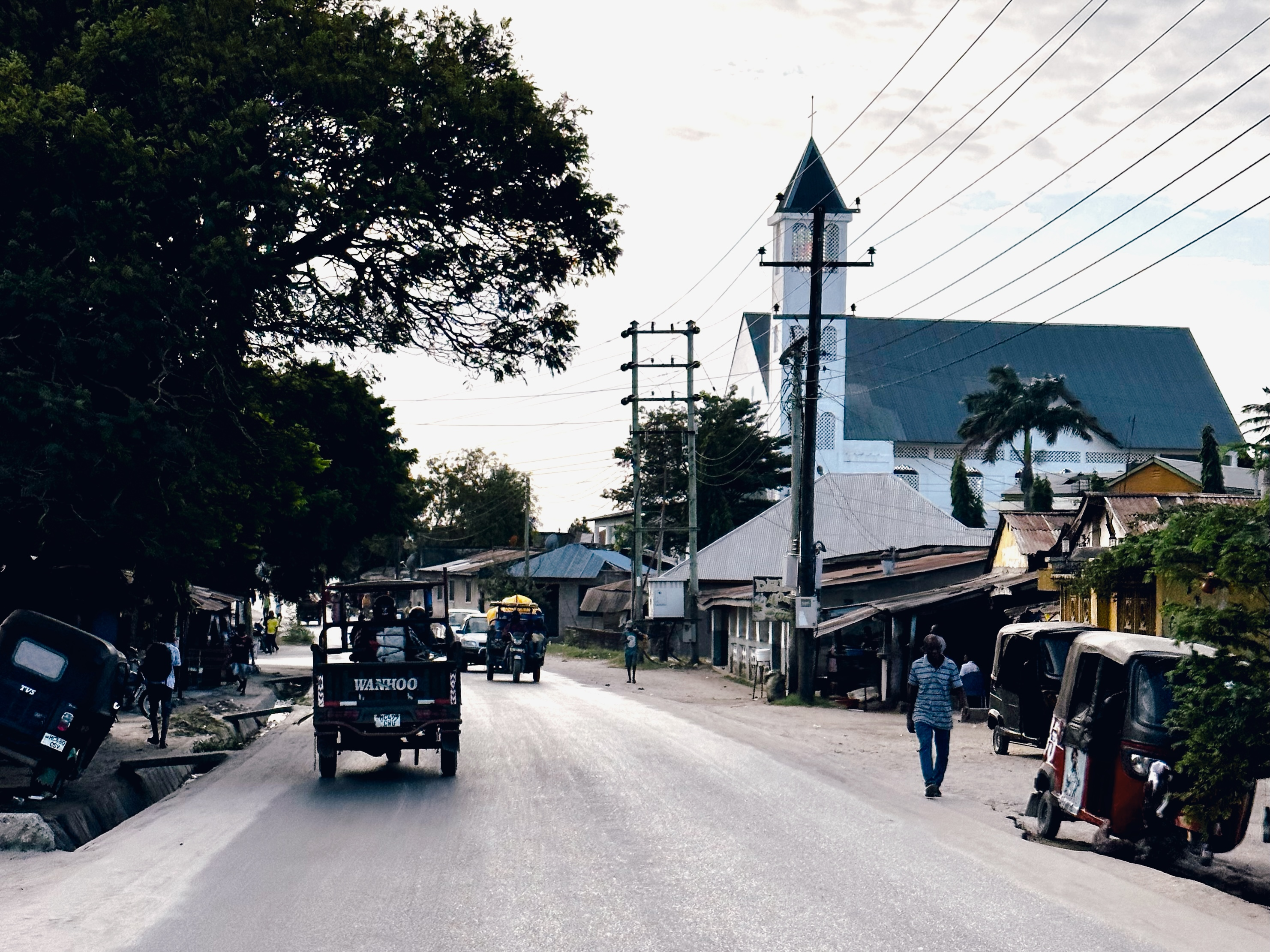
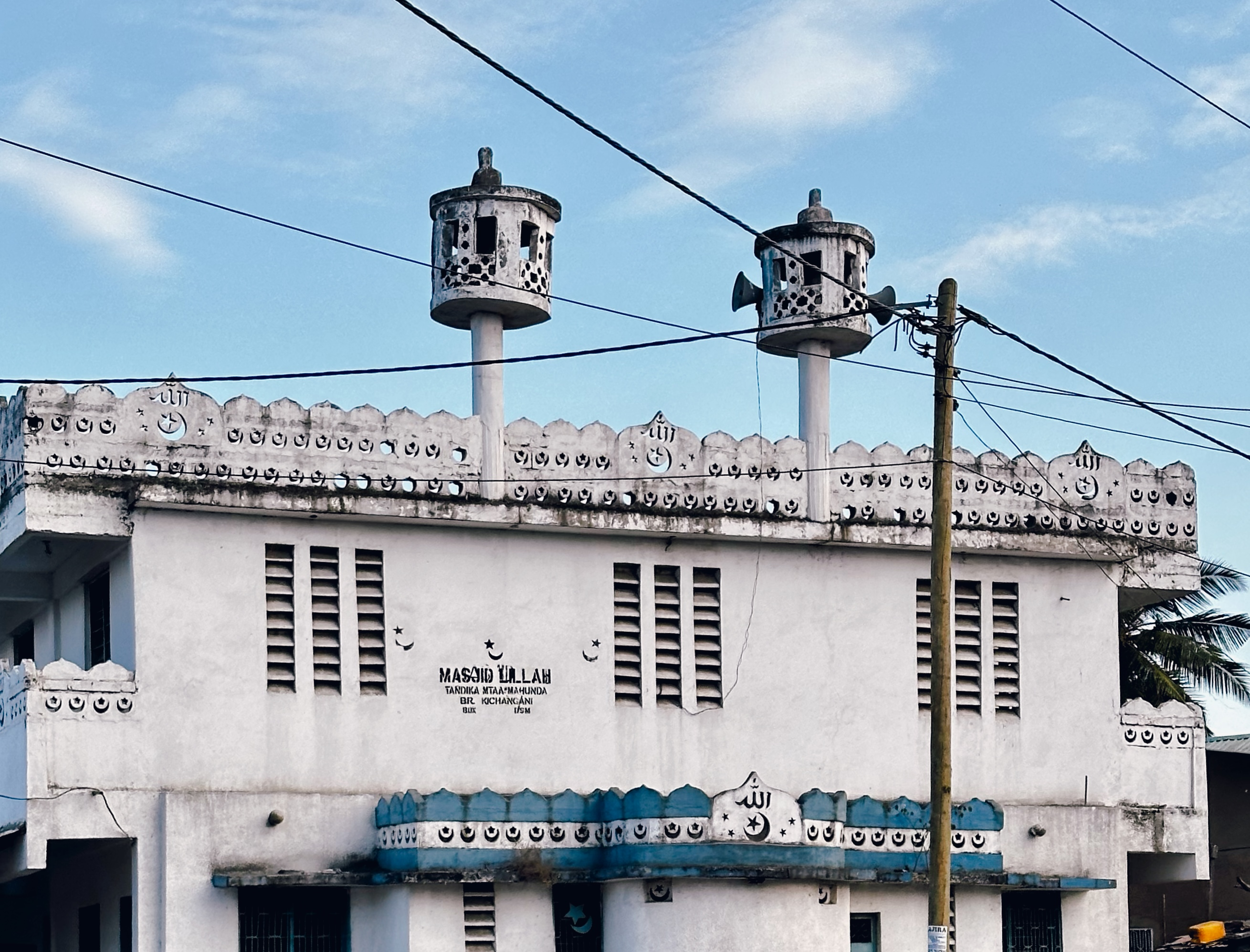
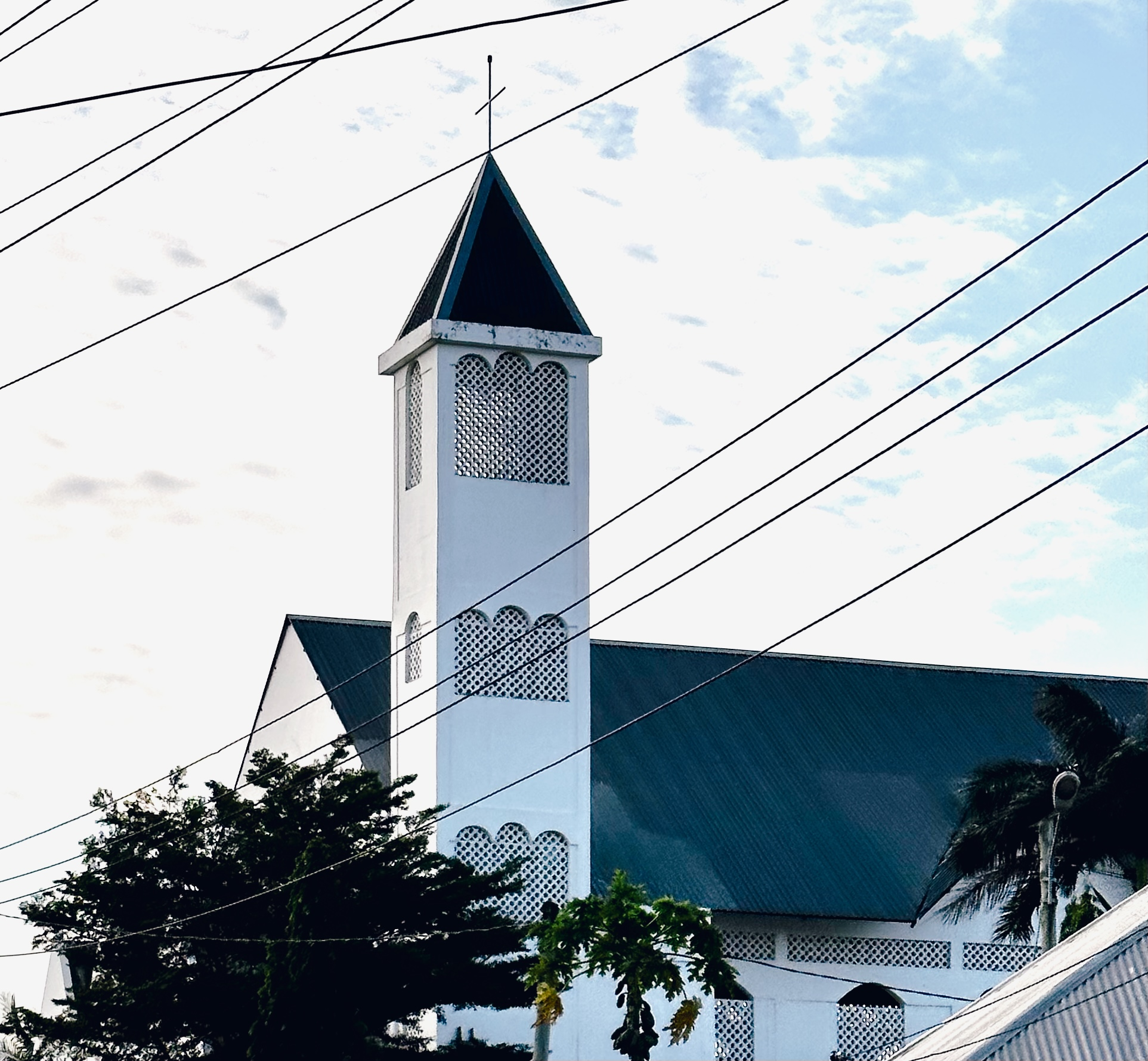
- From top to bottom: Scene in Azimio, mosquein Azimio & church close up in Azimio ward
- Interactive map of Azimio
- Coordinates: 6°50′22.92″S 39°13′30.36″E
- Country: Tanzania
- Region: Dar es Salaam Region
- District: Temeke District

Area
  - Total: 2.4 km^{2} (0.93 sq mi)

Population (2012)
  - Total: 76,832

Ethnic groups
  - Settler: Swahili
  - Ancestral: Zaramo
- Tanzanian Postal Code: 15106

Azimio (Kata ya Azimio, in Swahili) is an administrative ward in the Temeke district of the Dar es Salaam Region of Tanzania. Temeke and Miburani wards encircle the ward on its northern border. Makangarawe and Tandika are to the west. Buza, Mbagala, and Kijichi are to the south. Mtoni ward is to the east. According to the 2012 census, the ward has a total population of 55,082.

== Administration ==
The postal code for Azimio Ward is 15106. The ward is divided into the following neighborhoods (Mitaa):

- Azimio Kaskazini
- Azimio Kusini
- Kichangani, Azimio
- Mbuyuni, Azimio
- Mji Mpya, Azimio
- Mtongani, Azimio
- Mtoni Unguja, Azimio
- Tambukareli, Azimio

=== Government ===
Like every other ward in the country, the ward has local government offices based on the population served. The Azimio Ward administration building houses a court as per the Ward Tribunal Act of 1988, including other vital departments for the administration of the ward. The ward has the following administration offices:

- Azimio Police Station (Kituo cha Polisi)
- Azimio Government Office ( Ofisi ya Afisa Mtendaji wa Kata)
- Azimio Tribunal (Baraza La Kata) is a Department inside Ward Government Office

In the local government system of Tanzania, the ward is the smallest democratic unit. Each ward comprises a committee of eight elected council members, including a chairperson, one salaried officer (with no voting rights), and an executive officer. One-third of seats are reserved for women councilors.

== Demographics ==
The ward serves as the Zaramo people's ancestral home, along with much of the district. As the city developed over time, the ward became a cosmopolitan ward with a population of 76,832 as of 2012.

== Education and health ==
=== Education ===
The ward is home to these educational institutions:

- Mji Mpya Primary School
- Azimio Primary School, Azimio
- Kichangani Secondary School, Azimio

=== Healthcare ===
The ward is home to the following health institutions:

- Nuru Hospital, Azimio
