= Buza, Temeke =

Ward of Temeke District, Dar es Salaam Region

Buza Kata ya Buza (Swahili)
- Ward of Temeke District
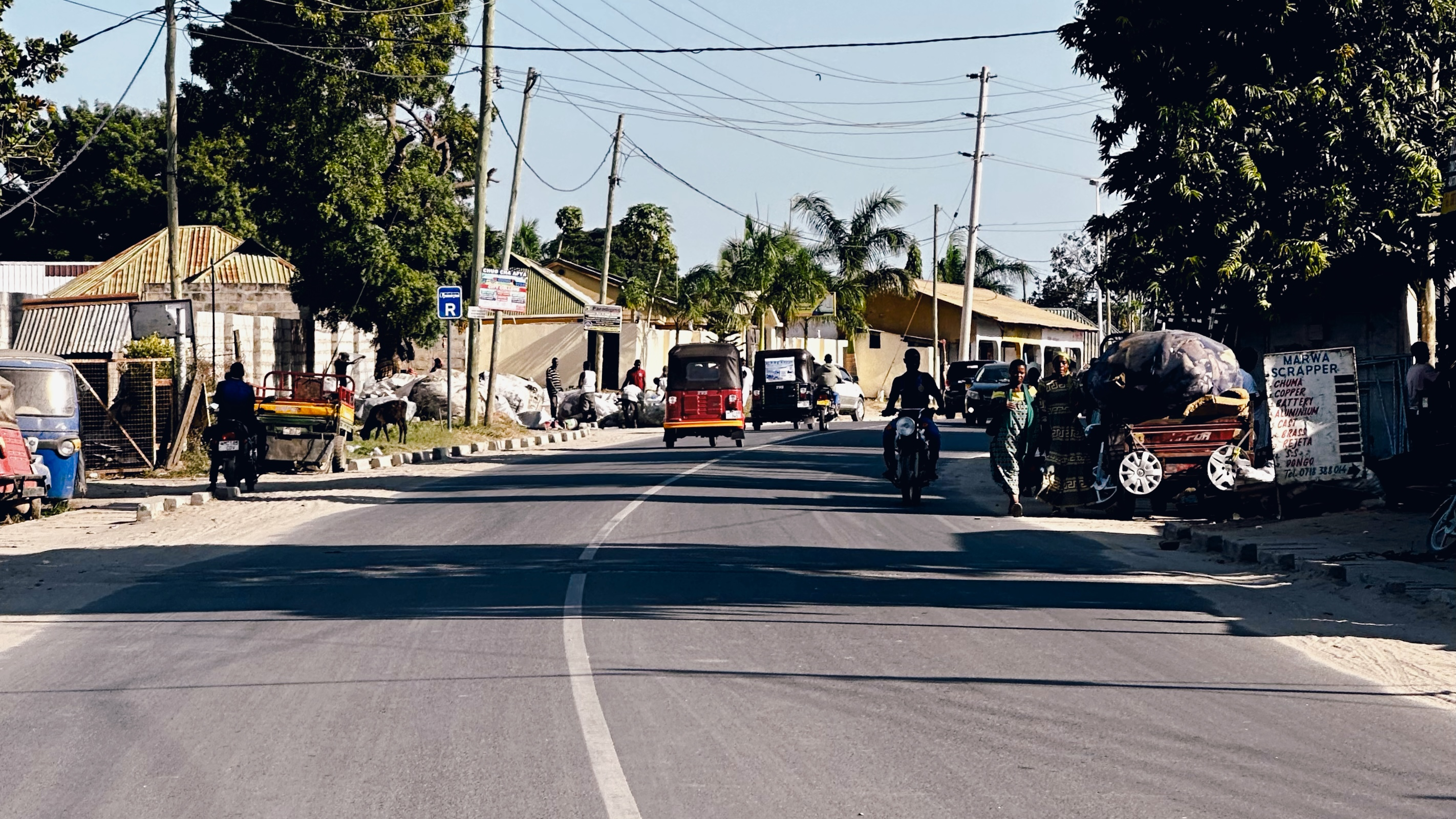
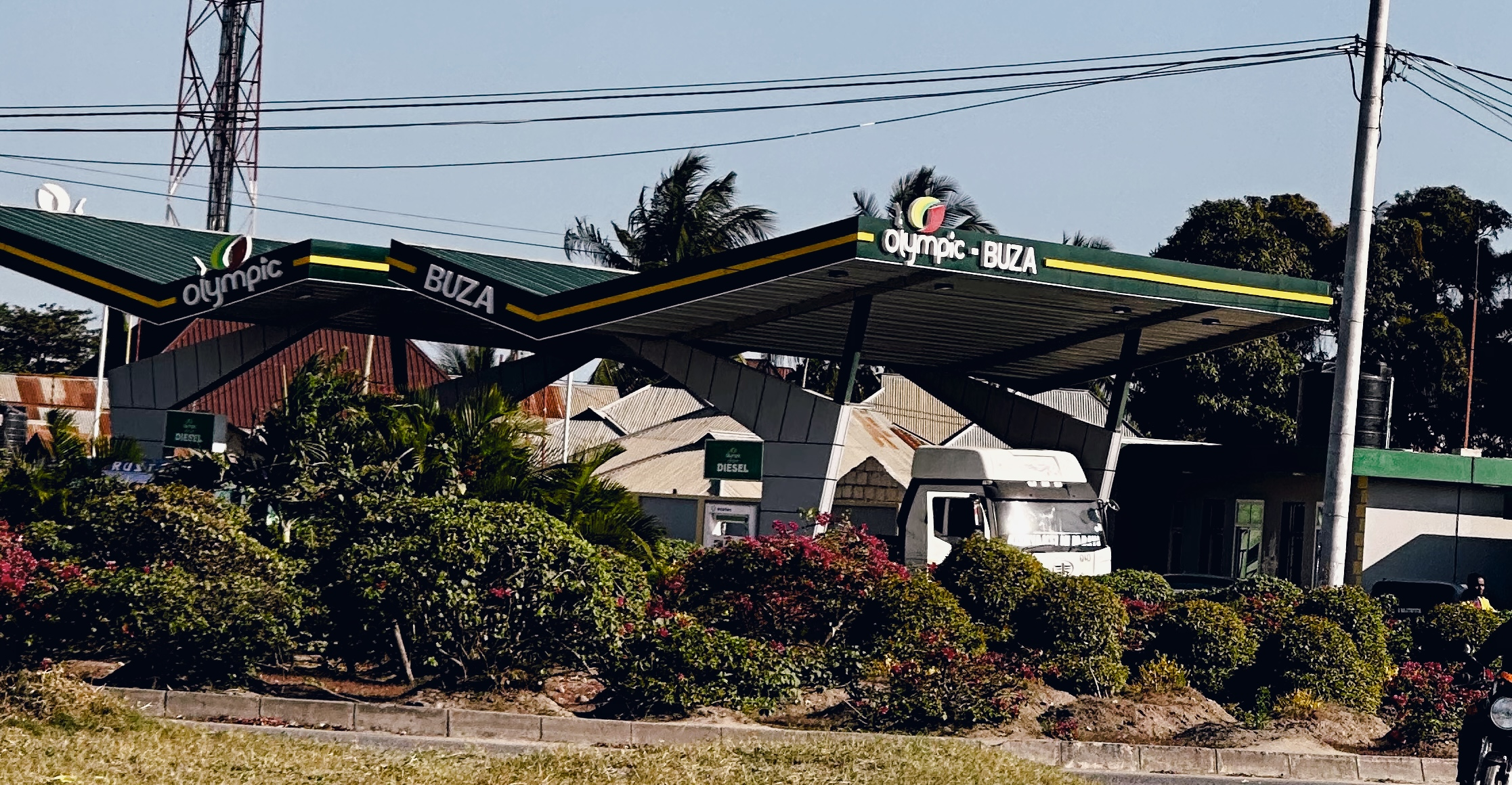
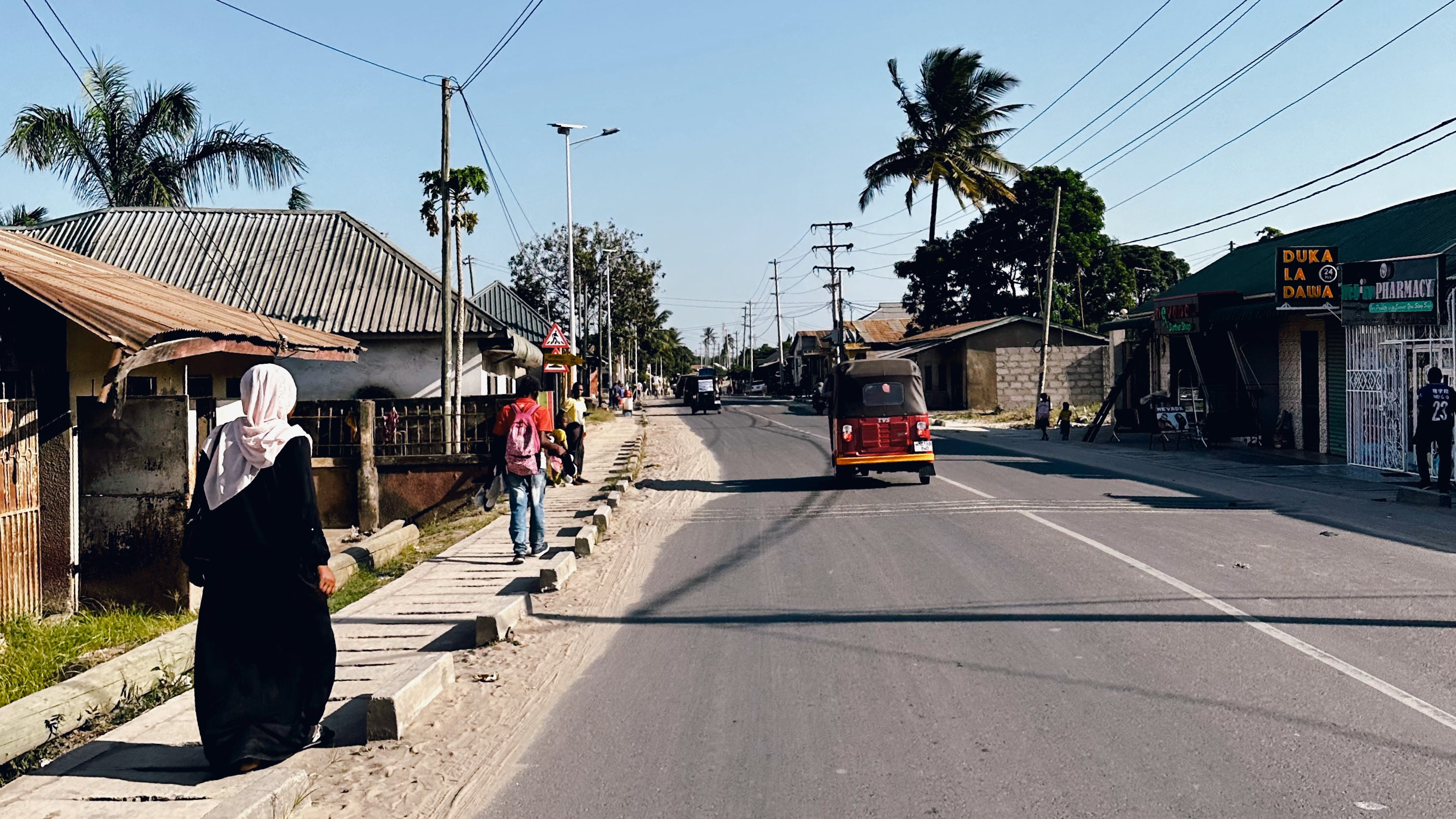
- From top to bottom: Street scene in Buza, gas station in Buza & Street through Buza
- Interactive map of Buza
- Coordinates: 6°53′33.72″S 39°14′27.24″E
- Country: Tanzania
- Region: Dar es Salaam Region
- District: Temeke District

Area
  - Total: 5.7 km^{2} (2.2 sq mi)

Population (2012)
  - Total: 55,082
- Demonym: Buzan

Ethnic groups
  - Settler: Swahili
  - Ancestral: Zaramo
- Tanzanian Postal Code: 15125

Buza (Kata ya Buza, in Swahili) is an administrative ward in the Temeke district of the Dar es Salaam Region of Tanzania. The communities of Yombo Vituka and Makangarawe encircle the ward to the north. The ward is bordered to the east by the wards of Azimio and Mbagala. Kiburugwa and the Kitunda ward of the Ilala District form its southern border. According to the 2012 census, the ward has a total population of 55,082.

== Administration ==
The postal code for Buza Ward is 15125. The ward is divided into the following neighborhoods (Mitaa):

- Amani
- Buza
- Kidagaa

- Mashine ya Maji
- Mji Mpya

=== Government ===
Like every other ward in the country, the ward has local government offices based on the population served. The Buza Ward administration building houses a court as per the Ward Tribunal Act of 1988, including other vital departments for the administration of the ward. The ward has the following administration offices:

- Buza Ward Police Station
- Buza Ward Government Office (Afisa Mtendaji)
- Buza Ward Tribunal (Baraza La Kata) is a Department inside Ward Government Office

In the local government system of Tanzania, the ward is the smallest democratic unit. Each ward comprises a committee of eight elected council members, including a chairperson, one salaried officer (with no voting rights), and an executive officer. One-third of seats are reserved for women councilors.

== Demographics ==
The ward serves as the Zaramo people's ancestral home, along with much of the district. As the city developed over time, the ward became a cosmopolitan ward.

== Education and health ==
=== Education ===
The ward is home to these educational institutions:

- Buza Primary School
- Amani primary School, Buza
- Sacred Heart Primary School
- Stabella English Medium Academy
- Satbella Primary School
- Buza Secondary School

=== Healthcare ===
The ward is home to the following health institutions:

- Dr. Moses ICS Charitable Dispensary
- Tyma Health Center
- Buza Health Center
- Good Hope Health Center
