= Tandika =

Ward of Temeke District, Dar es Salaam Region

Tandika Kata ya Tandika (Swahili)
- Ward of Temeke District
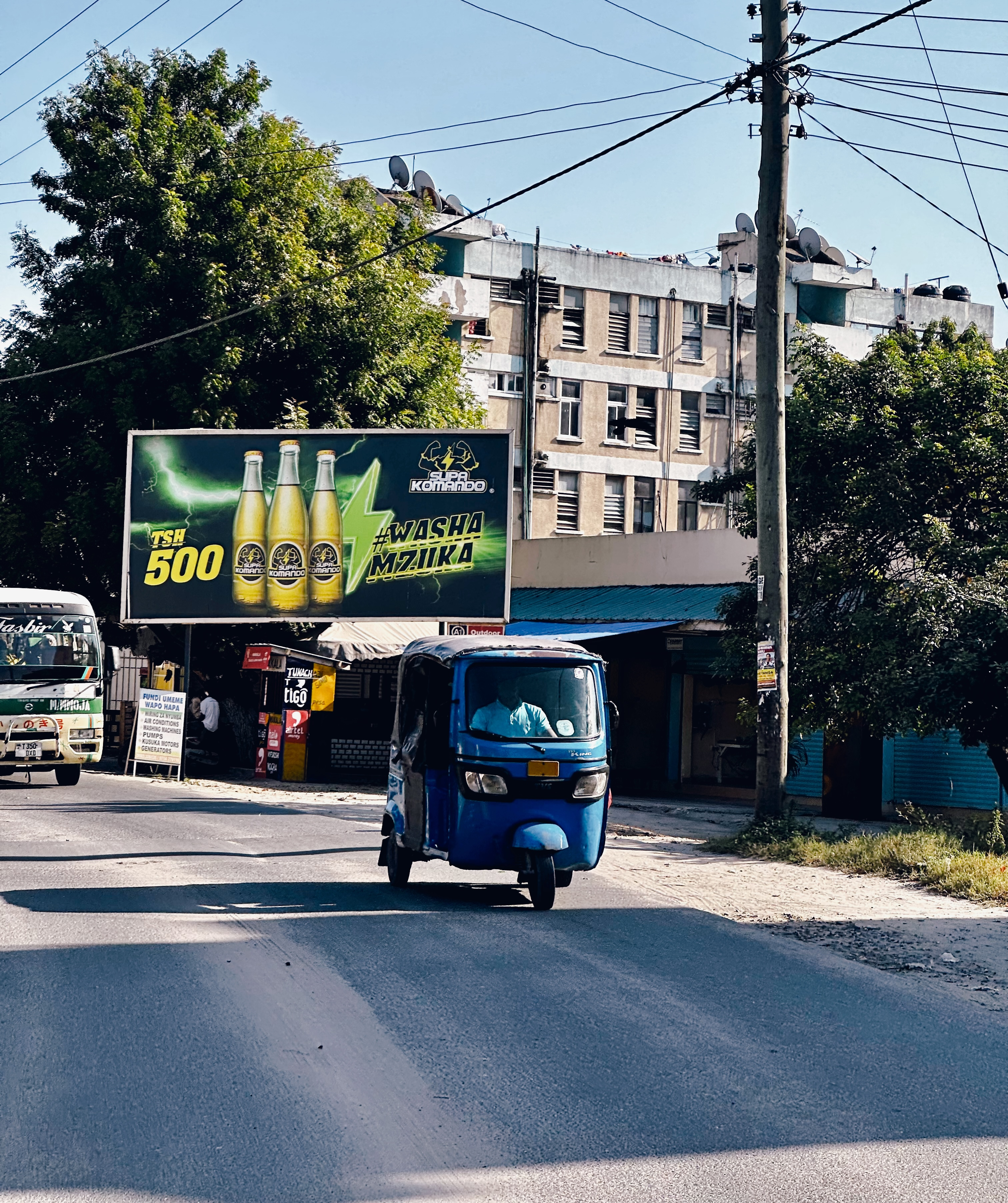
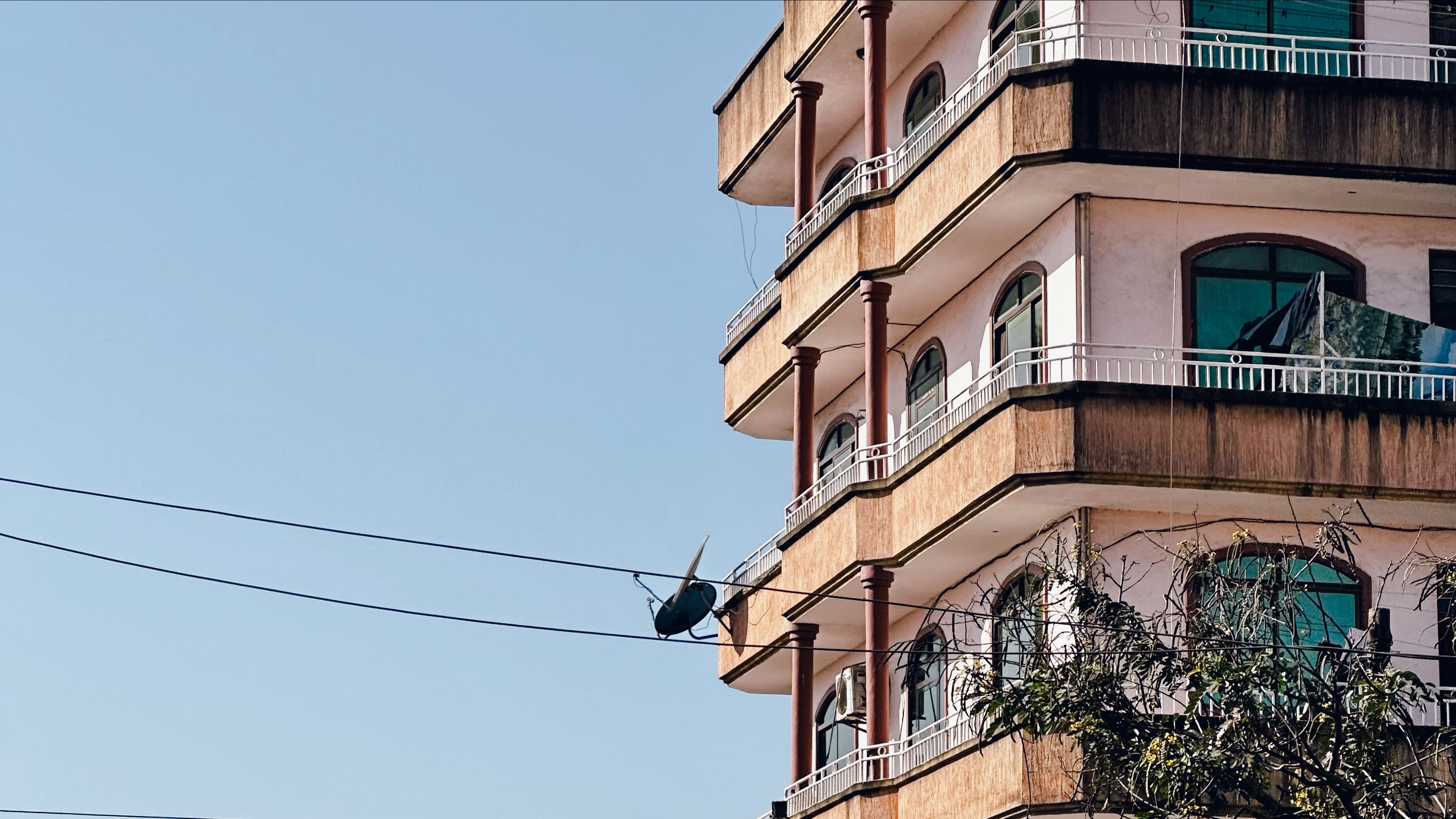
- From top to bottom: Apartment building in Tandika, street in Tandika and building in Tandika
- Interactive map of Tandika
- Coordinates: 6°52′13.44″S 39°15′21.24″E
- Country: Tanzania
- Region: Dar es Salaam Region
- District: Temeke District

Area
  - Total: 1.7 km^{2} (0.66 sq mi)

Population (2012)
  - Total: 49,491

Ethnic groups
  - Settler: Swahili
  - Ancestral: Zaramo
- Tanzanian Postal Code: 15107

Tandika (Kata ya Tandika , in Swahili) is an administrative ward in the Temeke district of the Dar es Salaam Region of Tanzania. Temeke and Sandali encircle the ward on its northern edge. the western side of Kilakala. The ward is bordered with Azimio to the east. The ward is bounded by Makangarawe to the south. According to the 2012 census, the ward has a total population of 49,491.

== Administration ==
The postal code for Tandika Ward is 15107. The ward is divided into the following neighborhoods (Mitaa):

- Kilimahewa
- Mabatini
- Maguruwe

- Nyambwera
- Tamla
- Tandika

=== Government ===
Like every other ward in the country, the ward has local government offices based on the population served. The Tandika Ward administration building houses a court as per the Ward Tribunal Act of 1988, including other vital departments for the administration of the ward. The ward has the following administration offices:

- Tandika Police Station (Kituo cha Polisi)
- Tandika Government Office ( Ofisi ya Afisa Mtendaji wa Kata)
- Tandika Tribunal (Baraza La Kata) is a Department inside Ward Government Office

In the local government system of Tanzania, the ward is the smallest democratic unit. Each ward comprises a committee of eight elected council members, including a chairperson, one salaried officer (with no voting rights), and an executive officer. One-third of seats are reserved for women councilors.

== Demographics ==
The ward serves as the Zaramo people's ancestral home, along with much of the district. As the city developed over time, the ward became a cosmopolitan ward with a population of 49,491 as of 2012.

== Education and health ==
=== Education ===
The ward is home to these educational institutions:

- Tandika Primary School
- Tandika Secondary School

=== Healthcare ===
The ward is home to the following health institutions:

- Bilal Health Center, Tandika
- Tyma Tandika Health Center
- Aga Khan Health Centre, Tandika
- Salaaman Health Center
