= Kitunda =

Ward of Ilala District, Dar es Salaam Region

Kitunda Kata ya Kitunda (Swahili)
- Ward of Ilala District
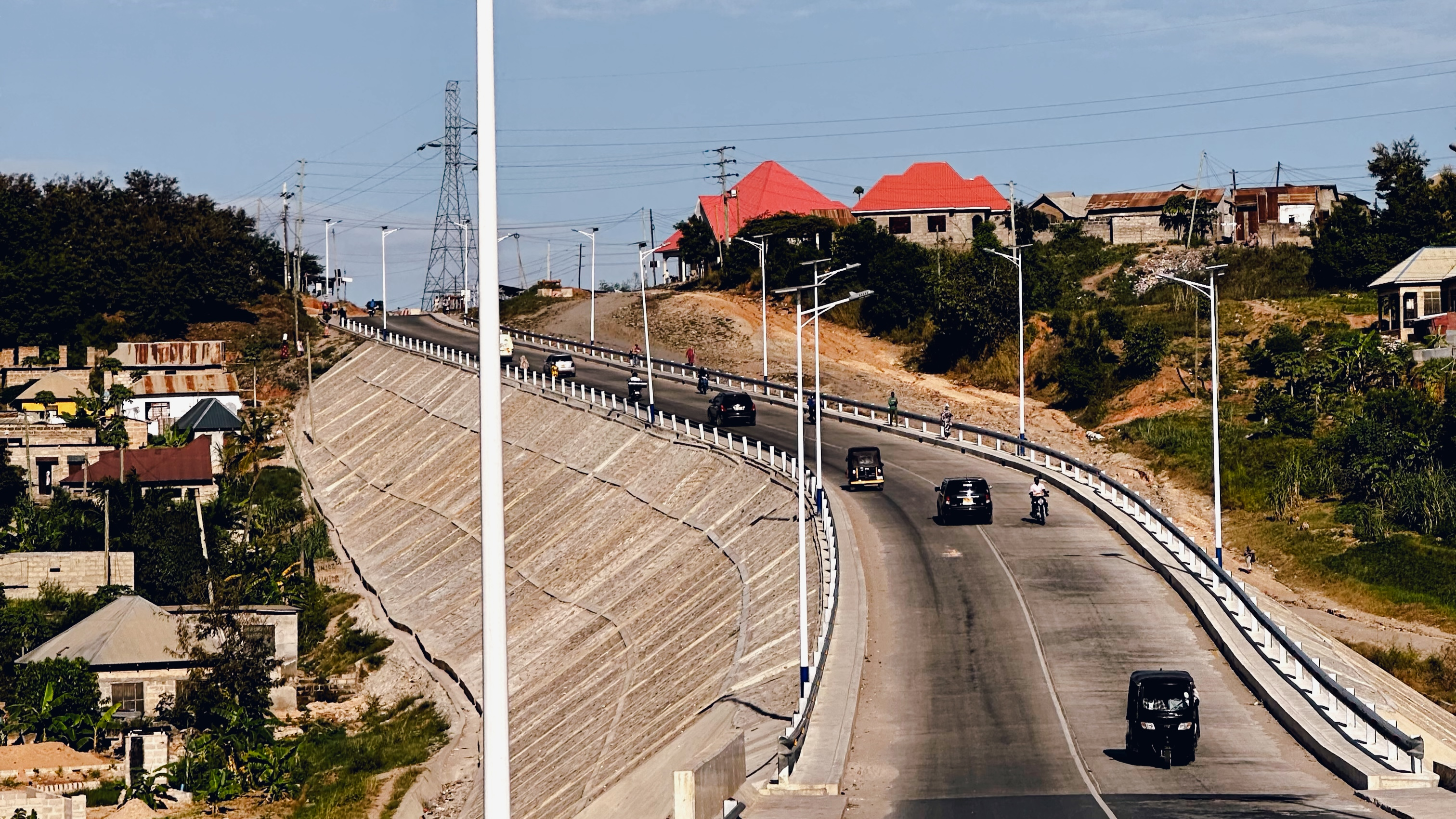
- From top to bottom: Bridge over Kitunda ward
- Interactive map of Kitunda
- Coordinates: 6°53′52.08″S 39°11′44.16″E
- Country: Tanzania
- Region: Dar es Salaam Region
- District: Ilala District

Area
  - Total: 19.6 km^{2} (7.6 sq mi)

Population (2022)
  - Total: 42,259

Ethnic groups
  - Settler: Swahili
  - Ancestral: Zaramo
- Tanzanian Postal Code: 12111

Kitunda (Kata ya Kitunda, in Swahili) is an administrative ward of the Ilala Municipal Council of the Dar es Salaam Region in Tanzania. Kipawa, Yombo Vituka, and Buza, the last two of Temeke MC, border the ward to the north. The Kiburugwa and Charambe wards of Temeke MC border the east of the ward. Chamazi is to the south, and Kivule lies to the west. According to the 2022 census, the ward has a total population of 42,259.

== Administration ==
The postal code for the Kipawa ward is 12111. The ward is divided into the following neighborhoods (Mitaa):

- Kipera
- Kitunda

- Kiyombo
- Relini, Kitunda

=== Government ===
The ward, like every other ward in the country, has local government offices based on the population served.The Kitunda Ward administration building houses a court as per the Ward Tribunal Act of 1988, including other vital departments for the administration the ward. The ward has the following administration offices:

- Kitunda Police Station
- Kitunda Government Office (Afisa Mtendaji)
- Kitunda Ward Tribunal (Baraza La Kata) is a Department inside Ward Government Office

In the local government system of Tanzania, the ward is the smallest democratic unit. Each ward is composed of a committee of eight elected council members which include a chairperson, one salaried officer (with no voting rights), and an executive officer. One-third of seats are reserved for women councillors.

== Demographics ==
The ward serves as the Zaramo people's ancestral home, along with much of the district. As the city developed throughout time, the ward became into a cosmopolitan ward. In total, 42,259 people called the ward home in 2022.

== Education and health ==
=== Education ===
The ward is home to these educational institutions

- Nyamata Primary School
- Bright African Primary School
- Sacred Heart Primary School
- St.James Primary School
- Mzinga Primary School
- Blessed Hill Primary School
- Kitunda Secondary School
- Mzinga Secondary School
- Mission Kitunda Secondary School

=== Healthcare ===
The ward is home to the following health institutions:

- St.Benedict Health Center
- Hekima Health Center
- Rungwe Dispensary, Kitunda
