= Makangarawe =

Ward of Temeke District, Dar es Salaam Region

Makangarawe Kata ya Makangarawe (Swahili)
- Ward of Temeke District
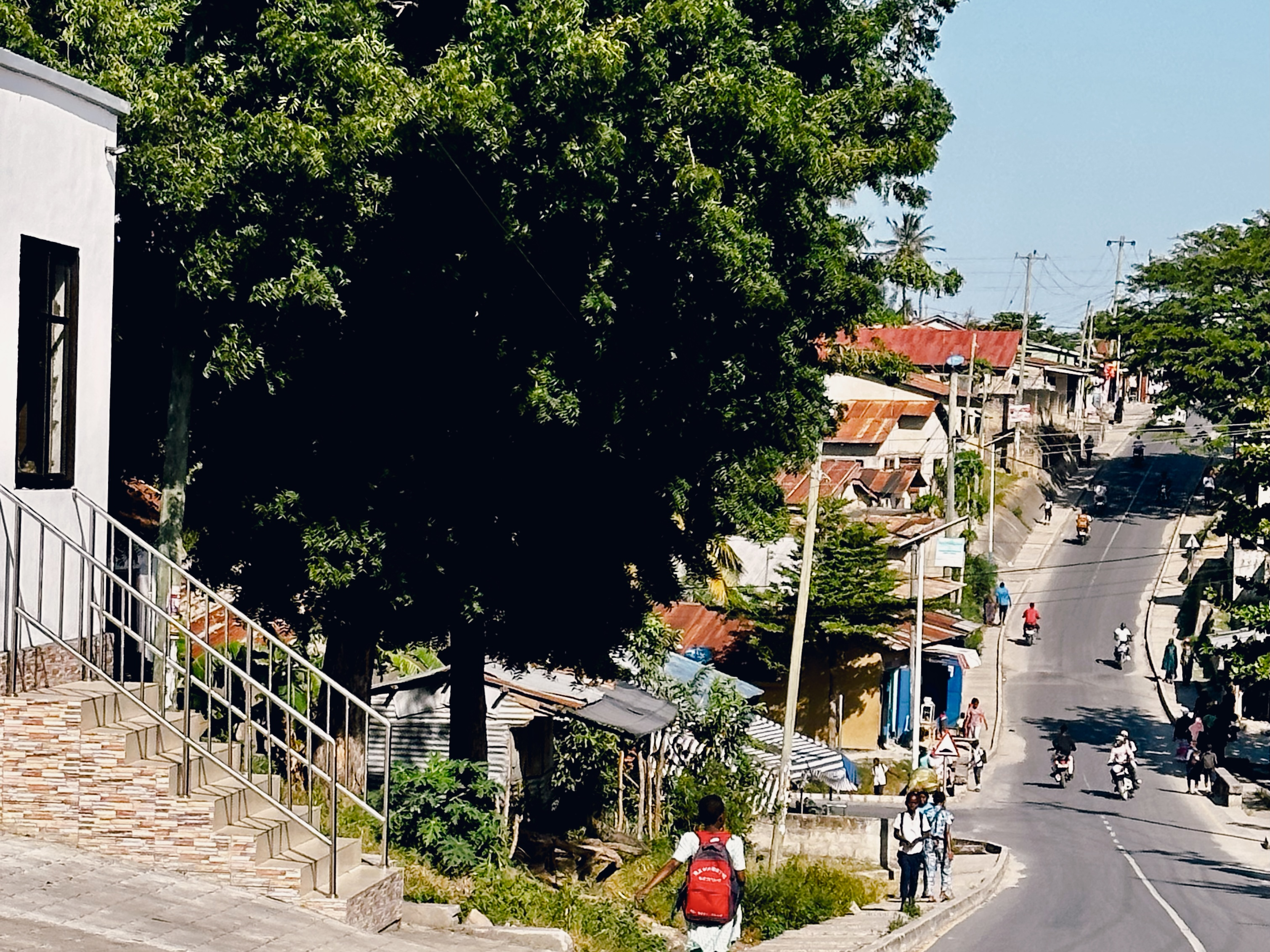
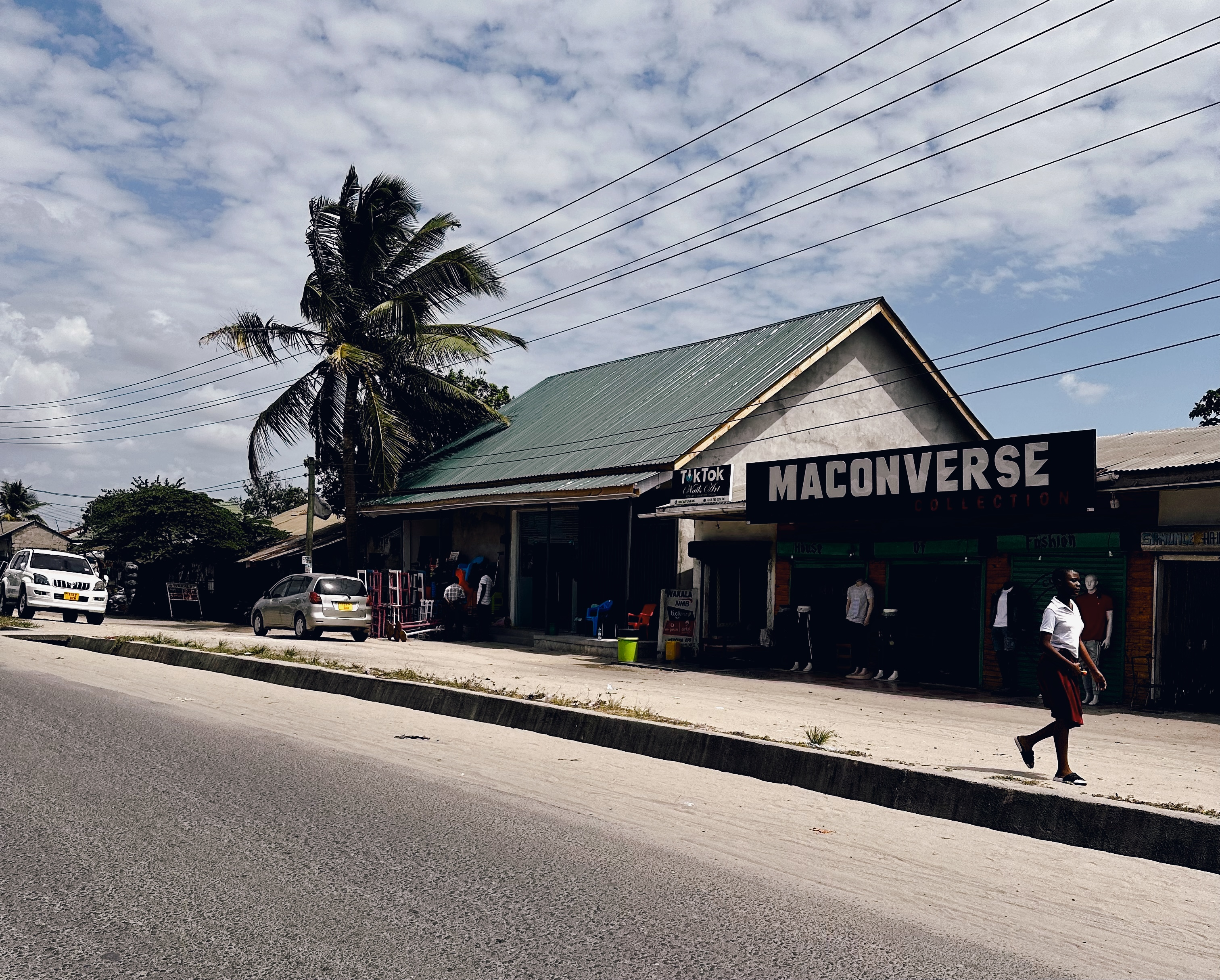
- From top to bottom: Scene in Makangarawe & Shops in Makangarawe ward
- Interactive map of Makangarawe
- Coordinates: 6°52′42.6″S 39°15′13.32″E
- Country: Tanzania
- Region: Dar es Salaam Region
- District: Temeke District

Area
  - Total: 2.3 km^{2} (0.89 sq mi)

Population (2012)
  - Total: 53,291

Ethnic groups
  - Settler: Swahili
  - Ancestral: Zaramo
- Tanzanian Postal Code: 15114

Makangarawe (Kata ya Mkangarawe , in Swahili) is an administrative ward in the Temeke district of the Dar es Salaam Region of Tanzania. The Kilakala and Tandika wards encircle the ward on its northern border. The ward is bordered by Buza to the south and Azimio to the east. Finally, Yombo Vituka borders the ward to the west. According to the 2012 census, the ward has a total population of 53,291.

== Administration ==
The postal code for Keko Ward is 15114. The ward is divided into the following neighborhoods (Mitaa):

- Makangarawe
- Mbonde
- Msakala

- Uwazi
- Yombo Dovya

=== Government ===
Like every other ward in the country, the ward has local government offices based on the population served. The Mkangarawe Ward administration building houses a court as per the Ward Tribunal Act of 1988, including other vital departments for the administration of the ward. The ward has the following administration offices:

- Mkangarawe Police Station (Kituo cha Polisi)
- Mkangarawe Government Office ( Ofisi ya Afisa Mtendaji wa Kata)
- Mkangarawe Tribunal (Baraza La Kata) is a Department inside Ward Government Office

In the local government system of Tanzania, the ward is the smallest democratic unit. Each ward comprises a committee of eight elected council members, including a chairperson, one salaried officer (with no voting rights), and an executive officer. One-third of seats are reserved for women councilors.

== Demographics ==
The ward serves as the Zaramo people's ancestral home, along with much of the district. As the city developed over time, the ward became a cosmopolitan ward with a population of 53,291 as of 2012.

== Education and health ==
=== Education ===
The ward is home to these educational institutions:

- Makangarawe Secondary School
- Yombo Dovya Primary School
- Jitihada Primary School

=== Healthcare ===
The ward is home to the following health institutions:

- Mkangarawe Hospital
