= Kiwalani =

Ward of Ilala District, Dar es Salaam Region

Kiwalani Kata ya Kiwalani (Swahili)
- Ward of Ilala District
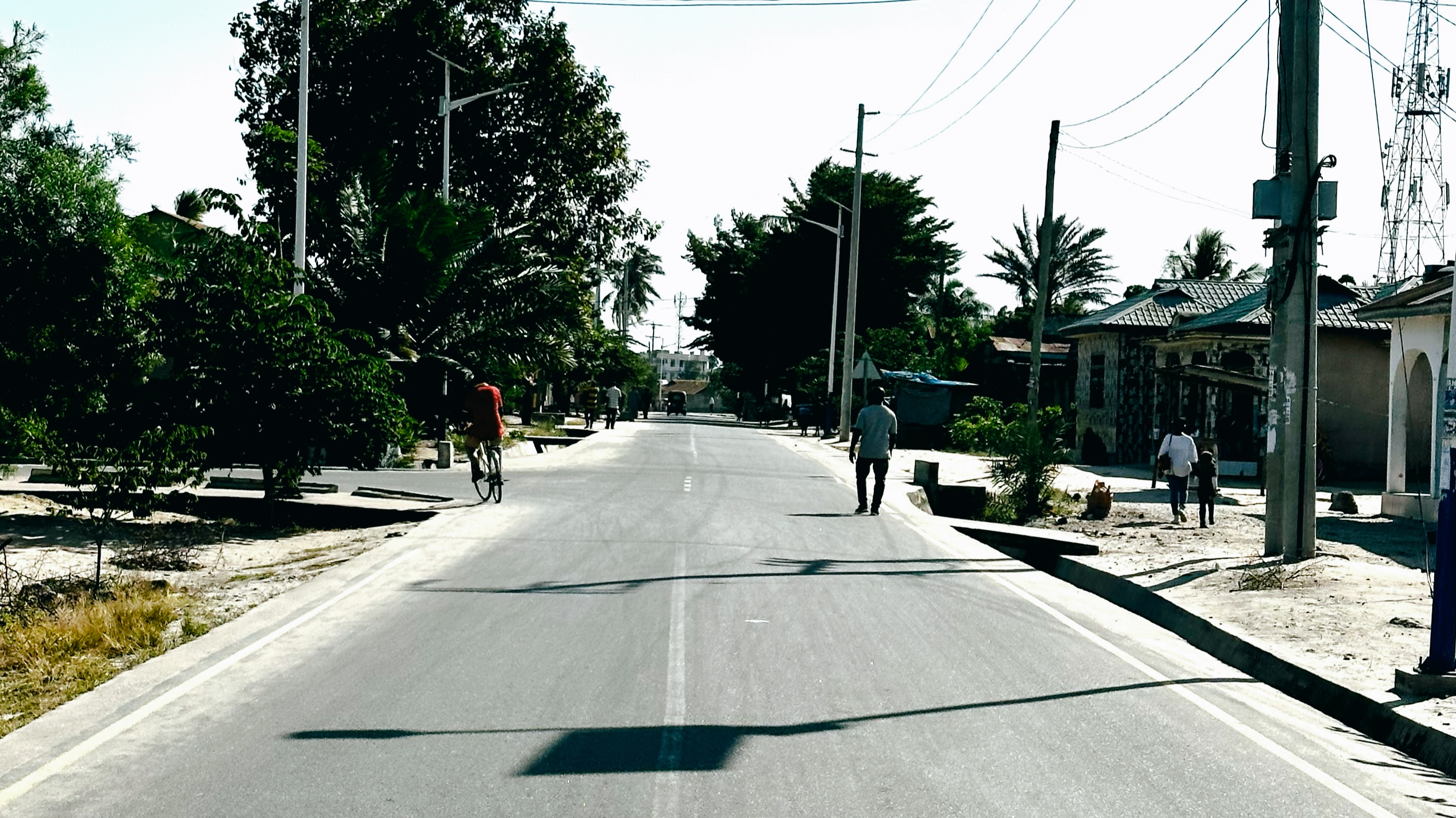
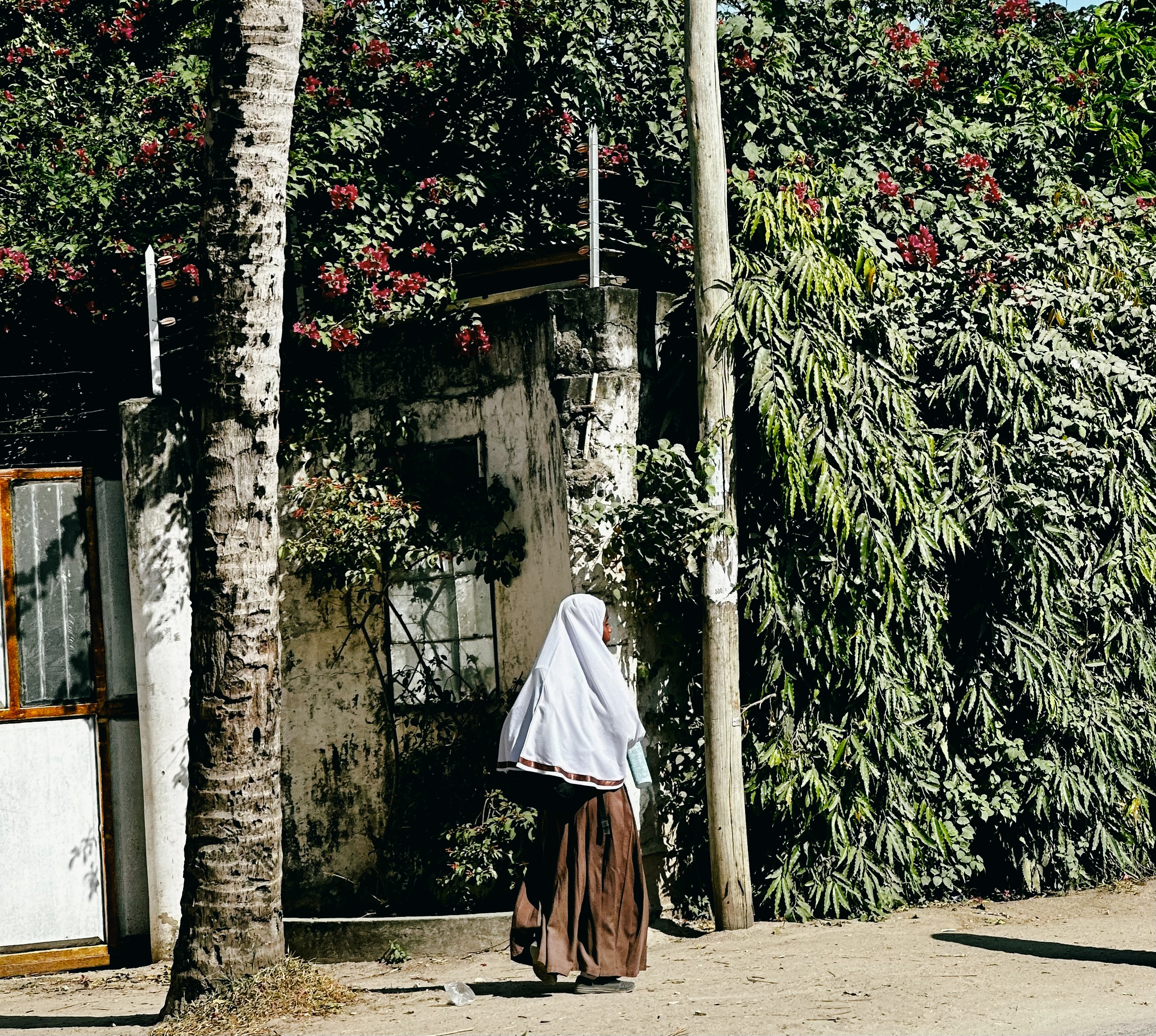
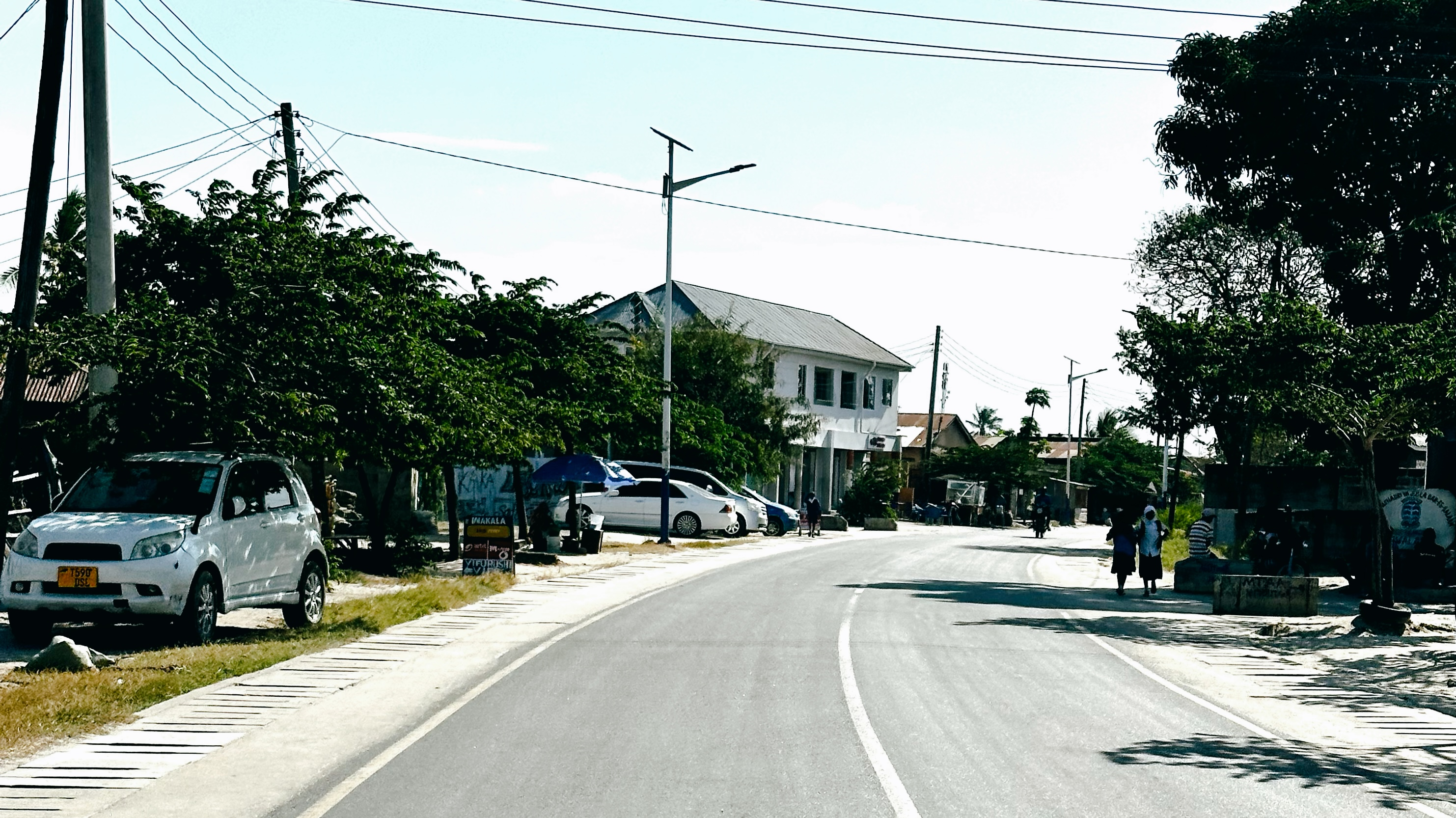
- From top to bottom: Kiwalani Street, A girl walking from school in Kiwalani, roads in the residential neighborhoods of Kiwalani
- Interactive map of Kiwalani
- Coordinates: 6°51′43.2″S 39°13′42.96″E
- Country: Tanzania
- Region: Dar es Salaam Region
- District: Ilala District

Area
  - Total: 4.3 km^{2} (1.7 sq mi)

Population (2022)
  - Total: 40,049

Ethnic groups
  - Settler: Swahili
  - Ancestral: Zaramo
- Tanzanian Postal Code: 12108

Kiwalani (Kata ya Kiwalani, in Swahili) is an administrative ward of the Ilala Municipal Council of the Dar es Salaam Region in Tanzania. Vingunguti and Kipawa form the ward's northern and western boundaries, respectively. Temeke MC's Sandali to the east and Temeke MC's Kilakala and Yombo Vituka to the south encircle the ward. According to the 2022 census, the ward has a total population of 40,049.

== Administration ==
The postal code for the Kiwalani ward is 12108. The ward is divided into the following neighborhoods (Mitaa):

- Kigilagila
- Kiwalani

- Yombo, Kiwalani

=== Government ===
The ward, like every other ward in the country, has local government offices based on the population served.The Kiwalani Ward administration building houses a court as per the Ward Tribunal Act of 1988, including other vital departments for the administration the ward. The ward has the following administration offices:

- Kiwalani Police Station
- Kiwalani Government Office (Afisa Mtendaji)
- Kiwalani Ward Tribunal (Baraza La Kata) is a Department inside Ward Government Office

In the local government system of Tanzania, the ward is the smallest democratic unit. Each ward is composed of a committee of eight elected council members which include a chairperson, one salaried officer (with no voting rights), and an executive officer. One-third of seats are reserved for women councillors.

== Demographics ==
The ward serves as the Zaramo people's ancestral home, along with much of the district. As the city developed throughout time, the ward became into a cosmopolitan ward. In total, 40,049 people called the ward home in 2022.

== Education and health ==
=== Education ===
The ward is home to these educational institutions

- Kiwalani Secondary School
- Mwale Primary School
- Bwawani Primary School, Kiwalani
- Yombo Primary School, Kiwalani

=== Healthcare ===
The ward is home to the following health institutions:

- Tyma Akudo Dispensary
- Mico Dispensary
- Mission Dispensary, Kiwalani
- Amani herbal Clinic, Kiwalani
- Kiwalani Health Center
- St. Camillius Hospital of Kiwalani
- Mivinjeni Health Center
