= Kipawa, Ilala =

Ward of Ilala District, Dar es Salaam Region

Kipawa Kata ya Kipawa (Swahili)
- Ward of Ilala District
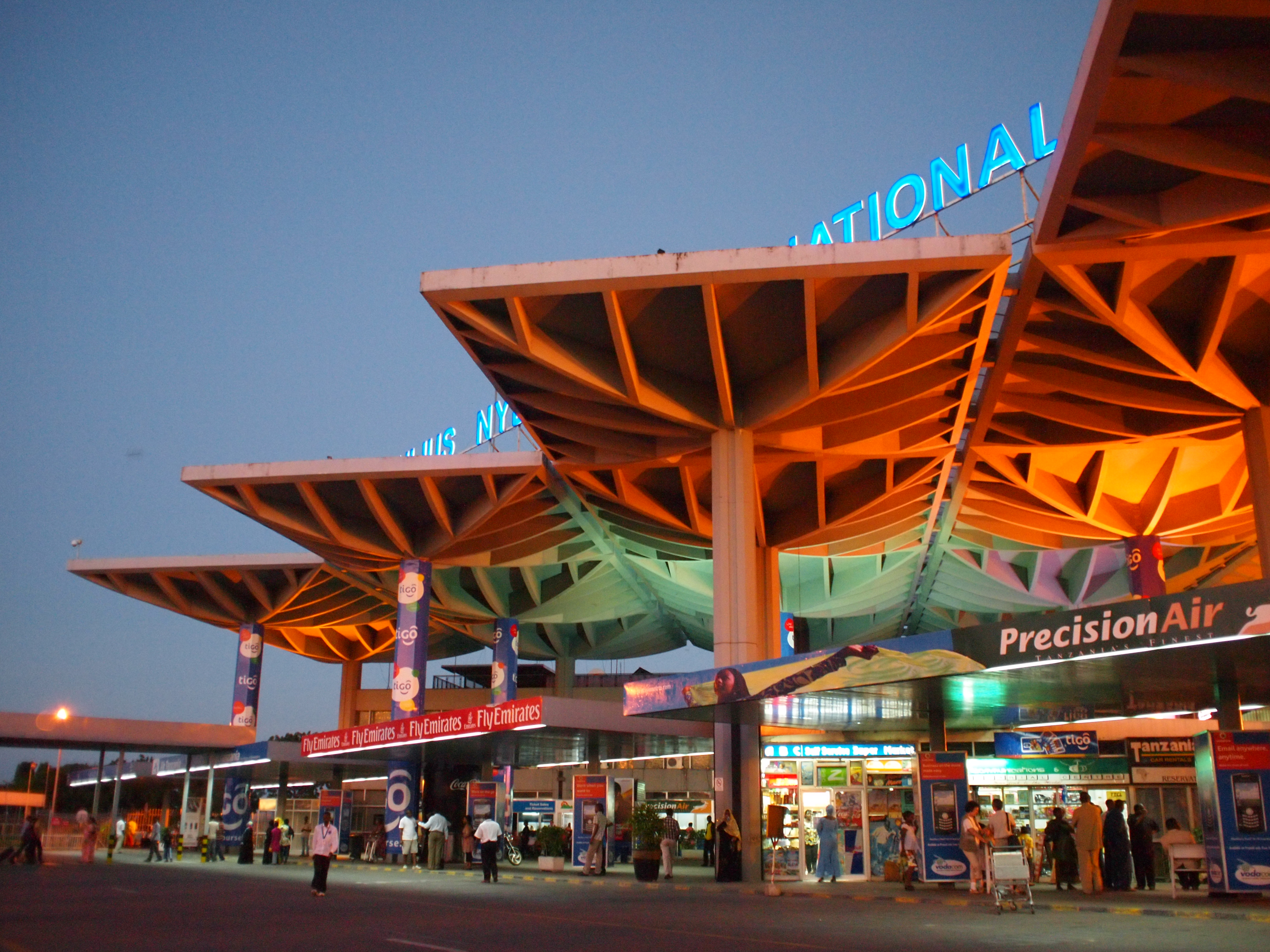
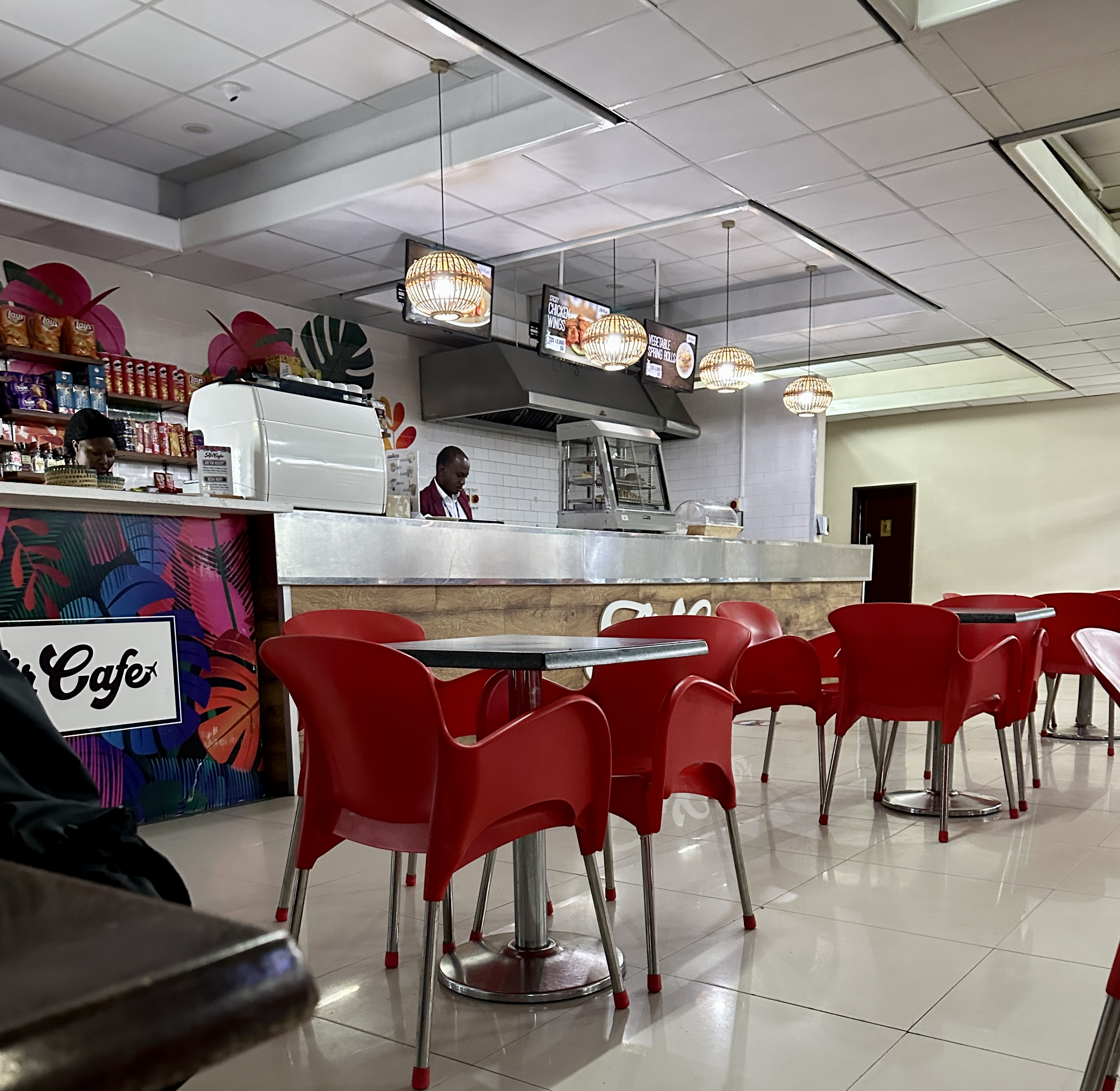
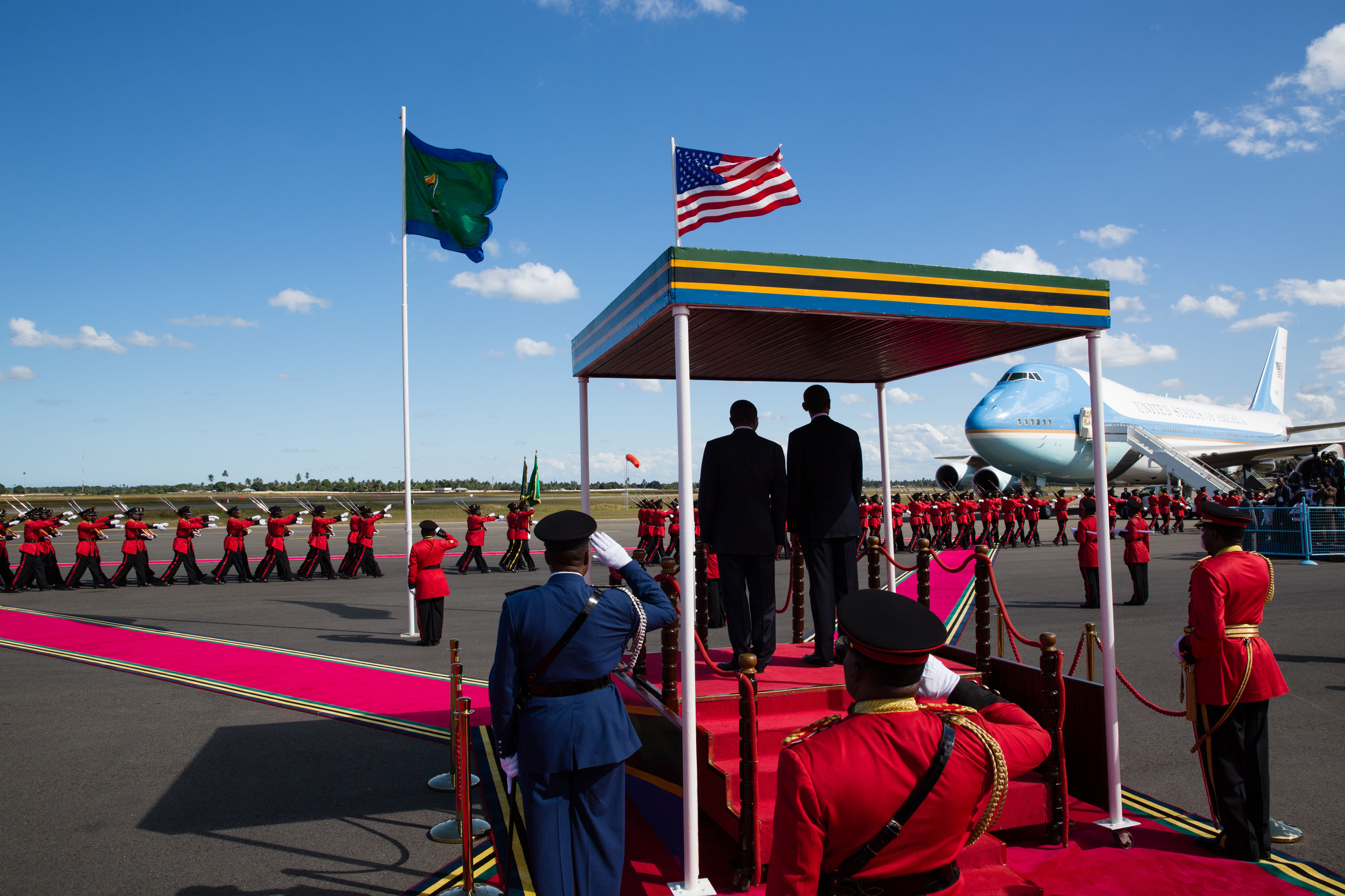
- From top to bottom: Terminal 2 at JNIA in Kipawa ward, Cafe in Terminal 2 of JNIA, Obama landing in Tanzania through JNIA in Kipawa ward
- Nickname: Tanzania's gate
- Interactive map of Kipawa
- Coordinates: 6°51′54.36″S 39°12′9.72″E
- Country: Tanzania
- Region: Dar es Salaam Region
- District: Ilala District

Area
  - Total: 15.6 km^{2} (6.0 sq mi)

Population (2022)
  - Total: 72,577

Ethnic groups
  - Settler: Swahili
  - Ancestral: Zaramo
- Tanzanian Postal Code: 12106

Kipawa (Kata ya Kipawa, in Swahili) is an administrative ward of the Ilala Municipical Council of the Dar es Salaam Region in Tanzania. Segerea and Kinyerezi border the ward on its northern border. The ward is bordered by Kiwalani to the east. By Kivule, Kitunda, and Yombo Vituka of Temeke MC to the south. Ukonga borders the ward on its western side. According to the 2022 census, the ward has a total population of 72,577.

== Administration ==
The postal code for the Kipawa ward is 12106. The ward is divided into the following neighborhoods (Mitaa):

- Karakata
- Kipunguni
- Mjimpya

- Mogo
- Stakishari
- Uwanja wa Ndege

=== Government ===
The ward, like every other ward in the country, has local government offices based on the population served.The Kipawa Ward administration building houses a court as per the Ward Tribunal Act of 1988, including other vital departments for the administration the ward. The ward has the following administration offices:

- Kipawa Police Station
- Kipawa Government Office (Afisa Mtendaji)
- Kipawa Ward Tribunal (Baraza La Kata) is a Department inside Ward Government Office

In the local government system of Tanzania, the ward is the smallest democratic unit. Each ward is composed of a committee of eight elected council members which include a chairperson, one salaried officer (with no voting rights), and an executive officer. One-third of seats are reserved for women councillors.

== Demographics ==
The ward serves as the Zaramo people's ancestral home, along with much of the district. As the city developed throughout time, the ward became into a cosmopolitan ward. In total, 72,577 people called the ward home in 2022.

== Education and health ==
=== Education ===
The ward is home to these educational institutions

- Kipunguni Primary School
- St. Scolastica Primary School
- Minazi Mirefu Primary School
- Kingdom Heritage Primary School
- Kipawa Libermann Primary School
- Loveness Primary School
- Majani ya Chai Primary School
- Ugombolwa Primary School
- Ilala Secondary School, Kipawa

=== Healthcare ===
The ward is home to the following health institutions:

- Taraja MDPTL Dispensary
- Afya Care Charity Dispensary
- Mission Dispensary
