= Kigamboni Naval Base =

Naval base in Dar es Salaam, Tanzania

- Kituo cha Jeshi la Wanamaji Kigamboni (Swahili)
- Kigamboni ward, Kigamboni District, Dar es Salaam in Tanzania
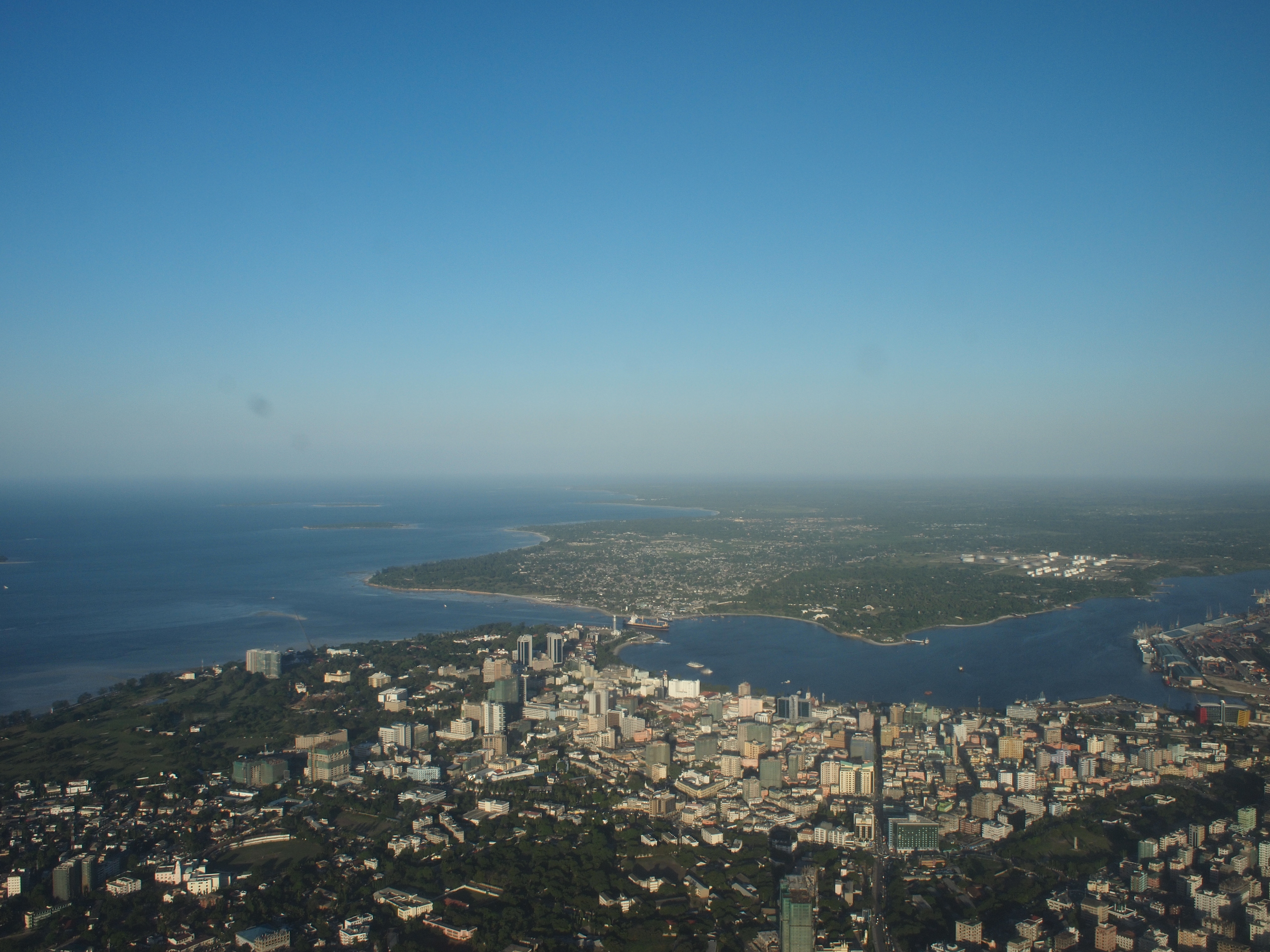
- Aerial view of Dar es Salaam, with Kigamboni across the creek

Site information
- Type: Naval base
- Owner: Tanzania Naval Command
- Website: www.navy.mil.tz

Location
- Coordinates: 6°49′47.2″S 39°18′7.6″E

Site history
- Built: 1970

The Kigamboni Naval Base (Kituo cha Jeshi la Wanamaji Kigamboni, in Swahili) is a naval base located in Kigamboni ward of Kigamboni District in Dar es Salaam, Tanzania. The base also hosts the Kigamboni Navy Health Center that is available to the public as well as Navy personnel. The base was built with assistance from China in return for international support in the global stage. President Julius Nyerere laid the foundation stone on 6 May 1970.
