= Latham Island =

Protected island of Kigamboni District in the Dar es Salaam Region of Tanzania

- IUCN category V (protected landscape/seascape)
- Location within Tanzania
- Location: Tanzania, Dar es Salaam Region, Kigamboni District
- Nearest city: Dar es Salaam
- Coordinates: 6°54′12″S 39°55′38″E
- Area: 0.03 km^{2} (0.012 sq mi)
- Established: March 2007
- Governing body: Revolutionary Government of Zanzibar

Latham Island, known locally as Fungu Kizimkazi (Swahili: Kisiwa cha Fungu Kizimkazi) is an isolated island 43 km east of Kigamboni District in the Dar es Salaam Region of Tanzania. The island geographically considered a part of the Zanzibar Archipelago of Tanzania, it was once politically under the Sultanate of Zanzibar from 1898 to 1963. Currently, the island is administered by the United Republic of Tanzania.

== Geography ==
Latham Island is a flat coral island located 66 km (41 mi) south-east of Unguja and 43.3 km (27 mi) east of Kimbiji, Kigamboni District, Dar es Salaam. It is roughly 300 metres (980 ft) long and 300 metres (980 ft) wide, and has an area of 3 hectares (7.4 acres). The island is surrounded by a fringing reef and is oceanic, as it lies off the continental shelf and is surrounded by deep water.

The island is 3 metres (9.8 ft) above spring tide level and is oblong in shape with its long axis facing north and south. The main coral platform currently measures around 287 metres (942 ft) by 157 metres (515 ft) at its widest point. However, estimates of its length range widely, from 182 metres (597 ft) to 289 metres (948 ft) or less, and the island is gradually sinking in the ocean. While the is unquestionably getting smaller owing to undercutting, the discrepancy in length estimates is likely caused by the existence of a moveable sandbank, which has, when present and exposed, been added to the length of the island. During the monsoon season, the bank is reported to move as much as feet of the bank can be exposed.

The main plateau is constructed of oolite with shards of unmodified coral bonded together with calcium phosphate. It has a flat top but very slightly higher at the southern end. A 3 metres (9.8 ft) high cliff is disintegrating into a tangle of rocks. By way of the vast guano deposits that blanket the majority of the island, the original coral over much of it has been changed to phosphates. Except for those parts where the guano is new and soft with a consistency similar to peat, the surface is hard; in these locations, the guano is at least one foot deep and has been measured to a depth of over three feet in one instance. However, it is only a few inches deep over the majority of the coral platform.

=== Ecology ===
The island is an important breeding ground for various bird species, namely the masked booby, greater crested tern, sooty tern and the brown noddy, and has been designated an Important Bird Area by BirdLife International. Latham is also thought to be of importance for nesting turtles.

In the past, Brown rats were observed in large numbers around the island, especially in the south and east where they hid among the rocks along the shore. Given that the rats are most likely to prey on the eggs and young of nesting seabirds, their prolonged existence on the island was a probable threat to them. Given that the island is nearly empty of flora and is absolutely devoid of fresh water, it is impossible to understand what the rats feed on when the birds are not around throughout the year. Later surveys of the Island report no observations of rats. This might be due to the 2004 Indian Ocean Tsunami, which might have eliminated the whole rat population.

On Mait Island in the Gulf of Aden, a similar situation can be observed. It is believed that the rats there obtain the majority of their moisture from eggs during the laying season and through cannibalism during the non-laying season. It is necessary to get rid of these rats given the eocological significance of Latham as a seabird breeding ground.

== History ==
In addition to Fungu Kizimkazi, the island also goes by a number of other Swahili names, the most noteworthy of which are Fungu la Mbarak, named for an Arab who was allegedly granted permission to gather debris there under the reign of Seyid Barghash, together with the southern Tanzanian islands of Shungu Mbili of the Mafia Archipelago, and Fanjove Island of the Songosongo Archipelago. It is believed to have appeared on a Portuguese map from the first half of the sixteenth century, but the East India man named Latham, who rediscovered it in 1758, gave it its current name that is recorded in European maps. It is currently a part of the United Republic of Tanzania.

Guano was said to be available in abundance on Latham in 1845, and Sultan Said awarded Messrs, Cogan and Co. of London and Zanzibar a concession for its extraction. Zanzibar sent workers to start the collecting. The project was halted due to a disagreement about this labour between the Sultan, Cogan, and the British Foreign Office, and it is unlikely that any guano was removed from the island. A rouge wave that hit Latham a few years later carried away the two huts that the labourers had constructed.

The Imperial Institute later examined Latham guano in 1920 with an eye towards potential future use. However, it was discovered that it had more phosphate and less nitrogen than usual Peruvian guano, albeit it did compare to that collected from Saldanha Bay, South Africa. Latham guano could be used for manurial purposes, but according to the paper, it would need to be combined with other minerals that have higher potash and nitrogen levels first.
