= Tanzania Naval Command =

- Kamandi ya Jeshi la Majini
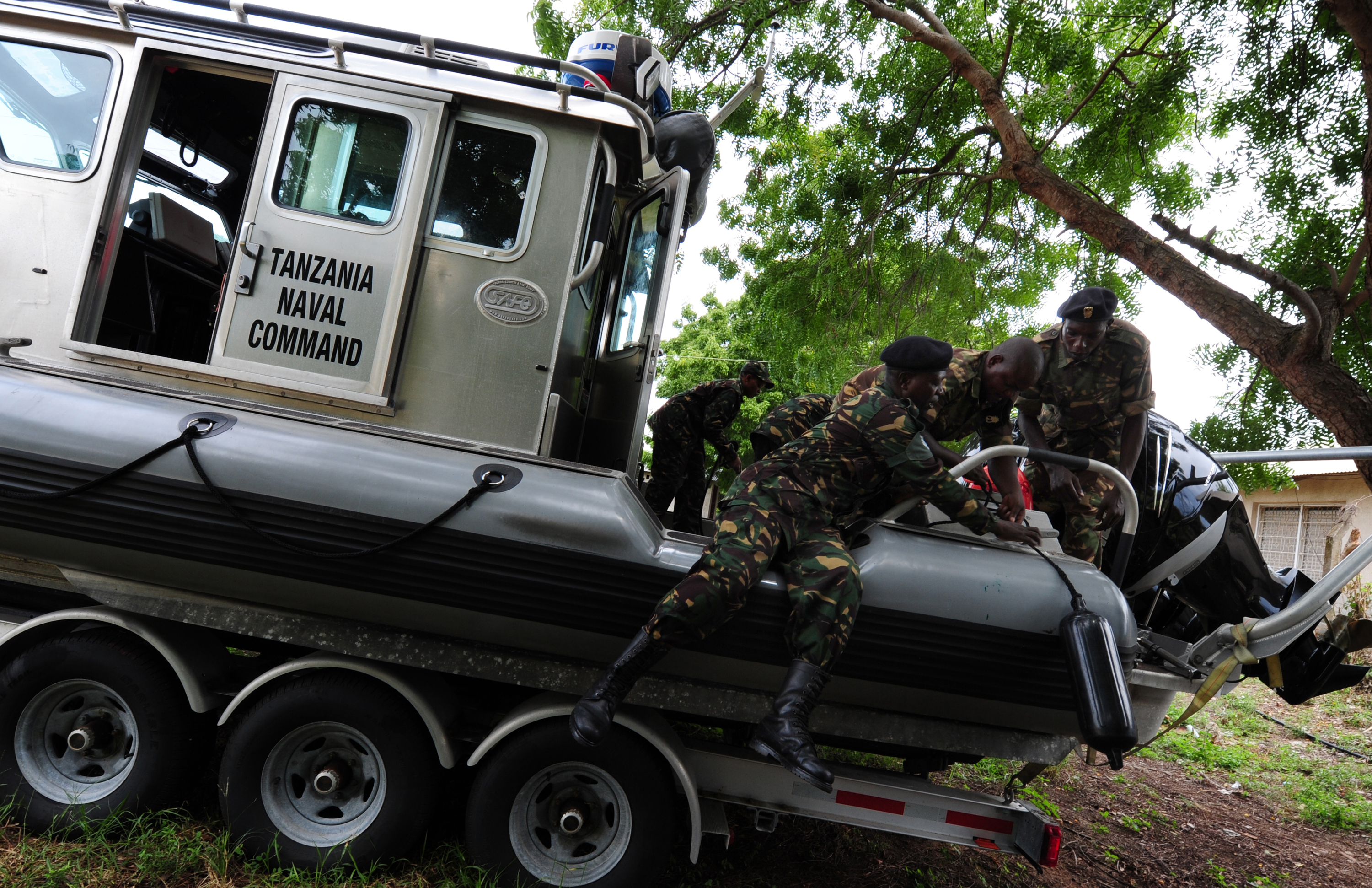
- Founded: 1971; 54 years ago
- Country: Tanzania
- Role: Naval warfare
- Part of: Tanzania People's Defence Force
- Headquarters: Kigamboni, Dar es Salaam
- Engagements: Uganda–Tanzania War; Operation Democracy in Comoros
- Website: www.navy.mil.tz

Commanders
- Commander: Rear Admiral Ramson Godwin Mwaisaka

Insignia
- Ensign & Jack

The Tanzania Naval Command (Swahili: Kamandi ya Jeshi la Majini) is the naval military branch of the Tanzania People's Defence Force (TPDF). It was established in 1971 with assistance from China.

== History ==
In the years immediately following independence, Tanzania did not have a navy. Coastal patrols were performed by the Police Marine Unit, using four Type 368 craft lent by the West German government. Cooperation ended abruptly following the recognition of East Germany by the Tanzanian government in February 1965. Four Shanghai class boats were given to the Police by the Government of the People's Republic of China to replace the West German vessels. These were to later form the nucleus of the Tanzanian Naval Command.

In 1968, the PRC reached an agreement to build a naval base for the TNC. Work on the facility began in January 1970, and was complete in December 1971. Between August 16th and August 20th in 2017, a flotilla from the People's Liberation Army Navy (PLAN) consisting of a destroyer, a frigate, and a supply vessel visited Dar es Salaam on 16–20 August.' During the visit, Rear Admiral Makanzo said that Tanzania currently had two marine infantry companies, which were trained by the PLAN, and that there were plans to form a third company that would be trained with help Chinese military. The rear admiral also said that Tanzanian marines were deployed in peacekeeping missions in the Central African Republic, Democratic Republic of the Congo, and South Sudan. In November of 2023, Tanzania Marine Special Forces concluded a Joint Combined Exchange Training with U.S. special operations forces in Dar es Salaam, Tanzania.

== Ships and weapons ==
As of 2016, the assets of the Tanzania Naval Command included:

- Four Huchuan class torpedo boats
- Two Ngunguri class vessels
- Two Shanghai II class patrol craft
- Two 27-foot Defender-type patrol boats
- Two Yuch'in class landing craft

In 2015–6, Tanzania replaced the two landing craft with similar Chinese Type 068 vessels. The new 28-metre vessels, Mbono and Sehewa, took part in an amphibious operation demonstration on 30 September 2016. They unloaded infantry and Type 63A amphibious light tanks as part of the exercise. The landing craft were delivered to the naval base in Dar es Salaam by January 2016.

== Bases ==
- Kigamboni Naval Base, Dar es Salaam
