= Tungi, Kigamboni =

Ward of the Kigamboni District in the Dar es Salaam Region of Tanzania

Tungi Kata ya Tungi (Swahili)
- Ward of Kigamboni District
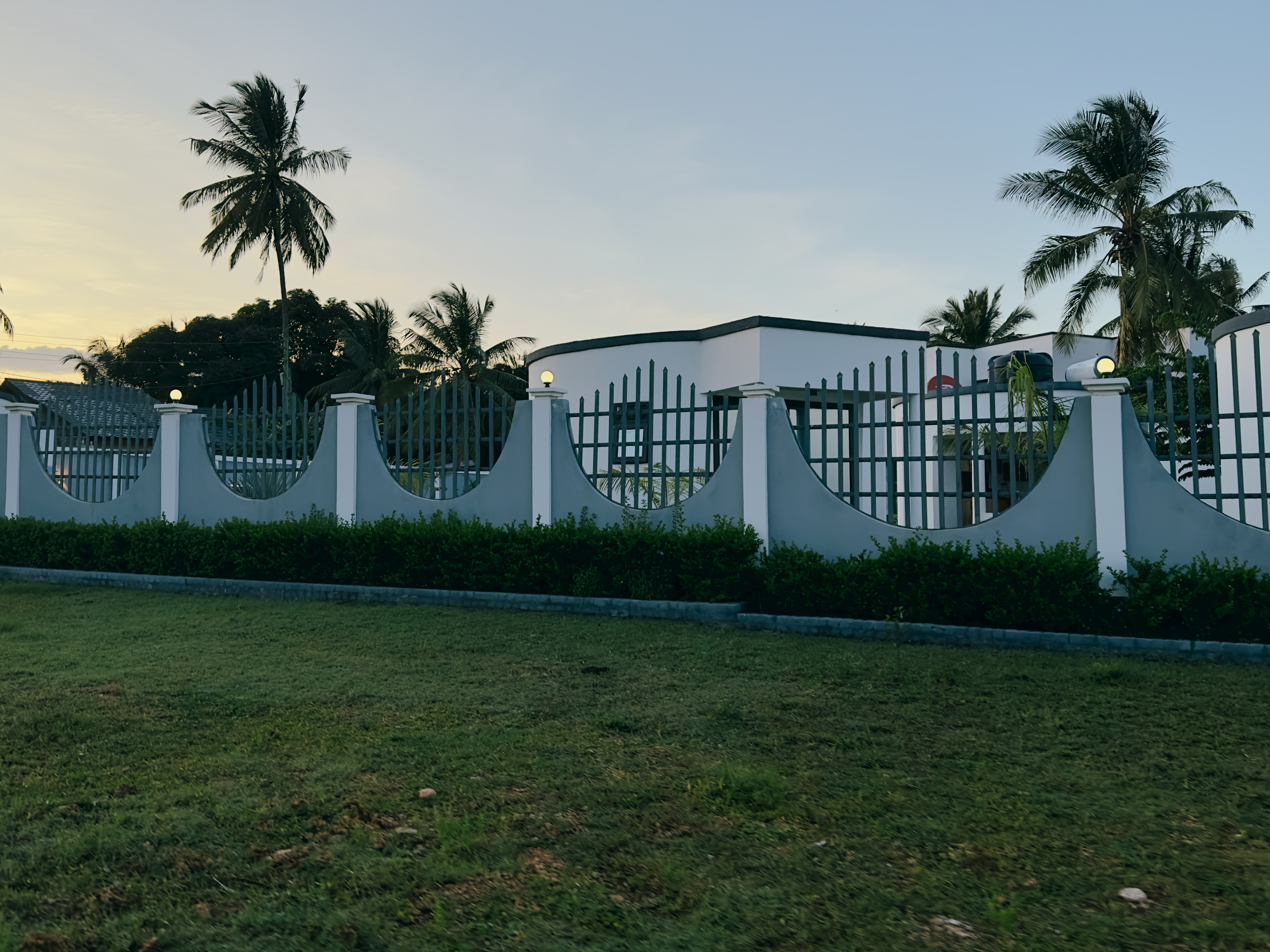
- From top to bottom: House in Tungi ward
- Interactive map of Tungi
- Coordinates: 6°50′17.16″S 39°19′14.88″E
- Country: Tanzania
- Region: Dar es Salaam Region
- District: Kigamboni District

Area
  - Total: 6.2 km^{2} (2.4 sq mi)

Population (2012)
  - Total: 23,380
- Demonym: Tungian

Ethnic groups
  - Settler: Swahili
  - Ancestral: Zaramo
- Tanzanian Postal Code: 17103

Tungi (Kata ya Tungi, in Swahili) is an administrative ward of Kigamboni District in the Dar es Salaam Region of Tanzania. The Indian Ocean borders the ward to the east, Mjimwema and Vijibweni wards to the south, and Dar es Salaam harbor to the west. The ward is surrounded by Kigamboni ward to the north. According to the 2012 census, the ward has a total population of 23,380.

== Administration ==
The postal code for Tungi Ward is 17103. The ward is divided into the following neighborhoods (Mitaa)/ Villages (Vitongoji):

- Magogoni
- Muungano, Tungi

- Tungi

=== Government ===
The ward, like every other ward in the country, has local government offices based on the population served.The Tungi Ward administration building houses a court as per the Ward Tribunal Act of 1988, including other vital departments for the administration the ward. The ward has the following administration offices:

- Tungi Ward Police Station
- Tungi Ward Government Office (Afisa Mtendaji)
- Tungi Ward Tribunal (Baraza La Kata) is a Department inside Ward Government Office

In the local government system of Tanzania, the ward is the smallest democratic unit. Each ward is composed of a committee of eight elected council members which include a chairperson, one salaried officer (with no voting rights), and an executive officer. One-third of seats are reserved for women councillors.

== Demographics ==
The ward is the Zaramo people's ancestral home, much like the majority of the district. As the city grew throughout time, the ward became into a cosmopolitan ward. The ward's overall population was 23,380 in 2012.

== Education and health ==
=== Education ===
The ward is home to these educational institutions:

- Mahenge Primary School
- Fray Luis Amigo Primary School

=== Healthcare ===
The ward is home to the following health institutions:

- Arafa Kisiwani Dispensary
