= Somangila =

District of Tanzania

Somangila Kata ya Somangila (Swahili)
- Ward of Kigamboni District
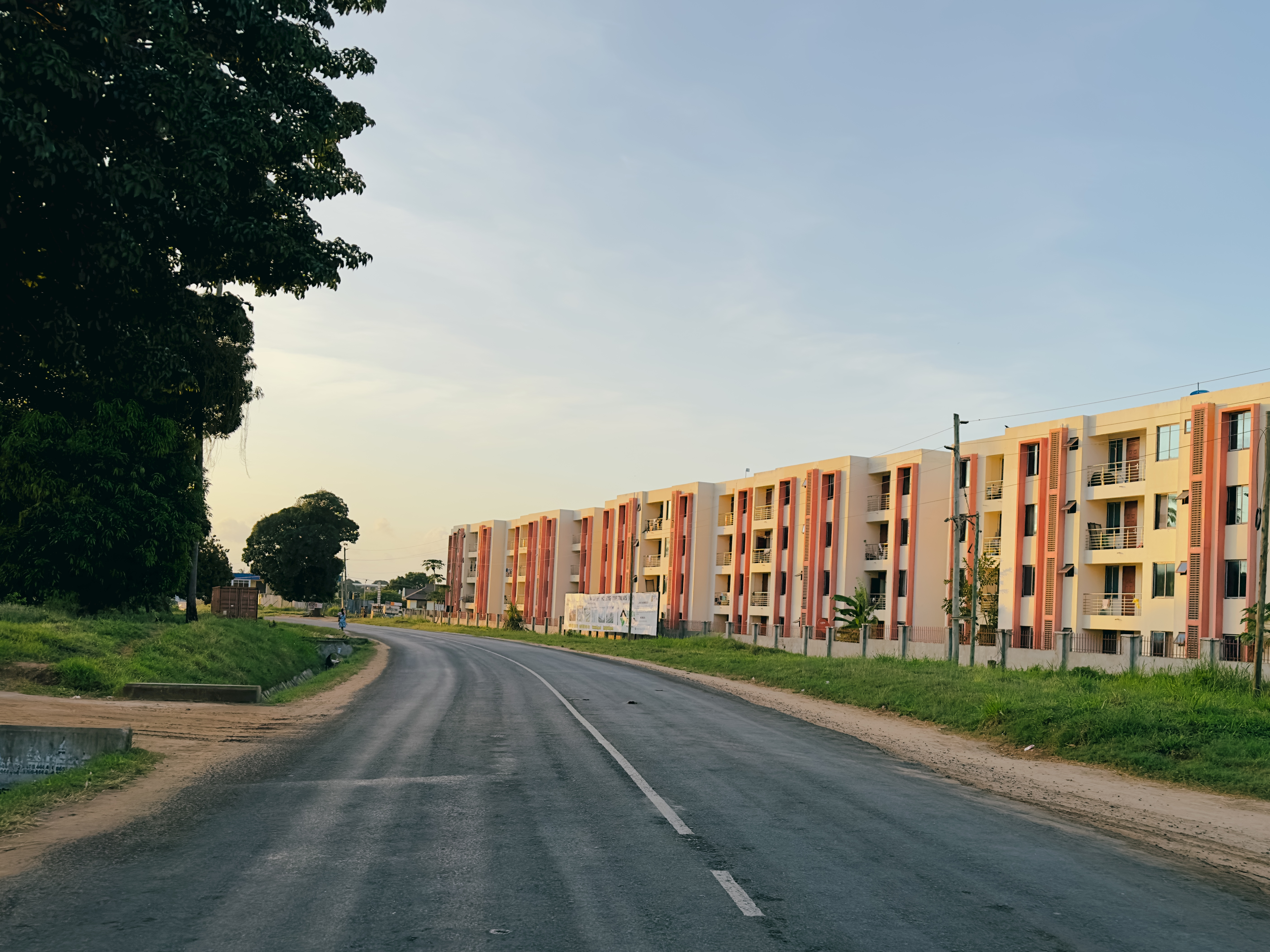
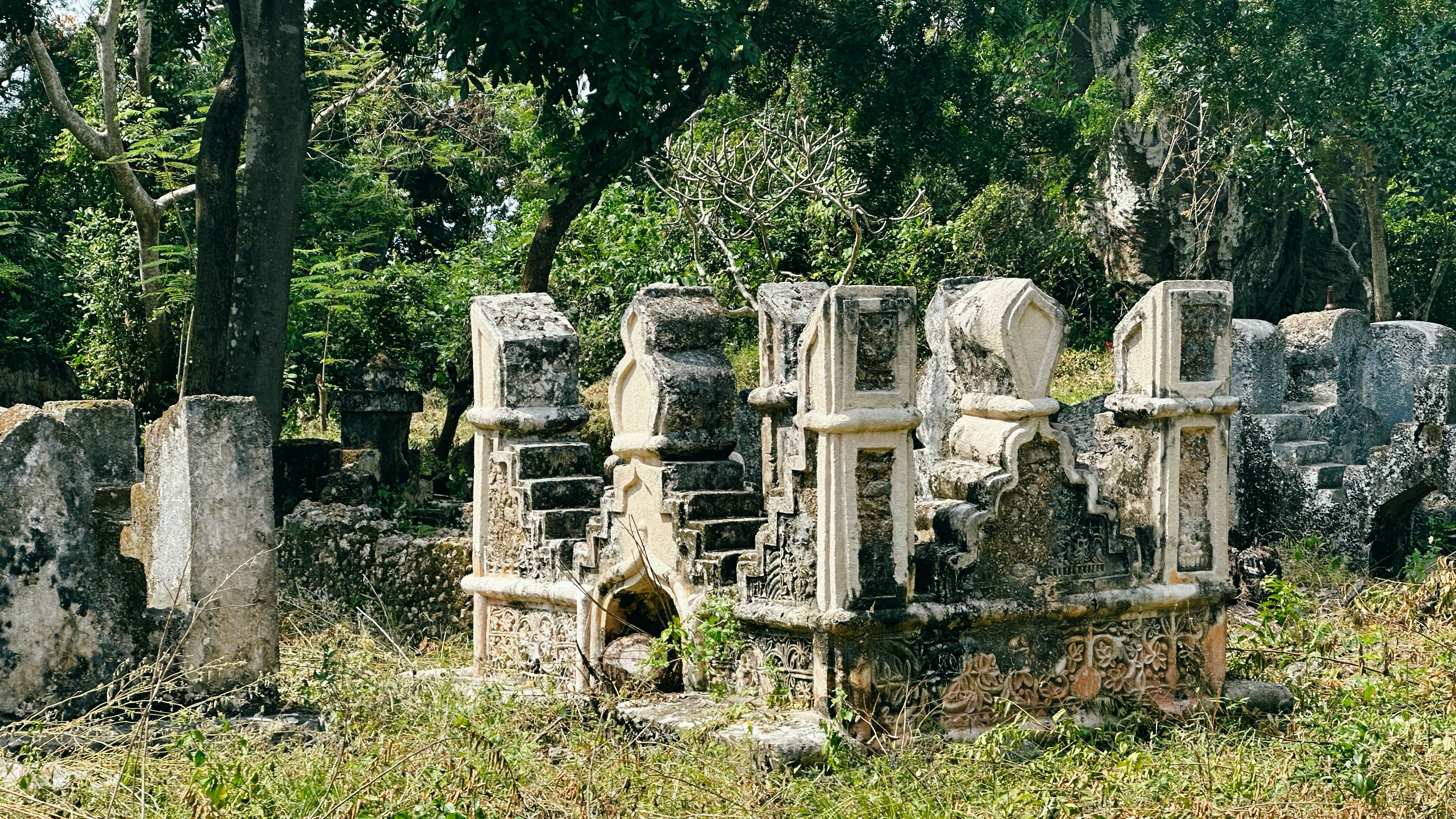
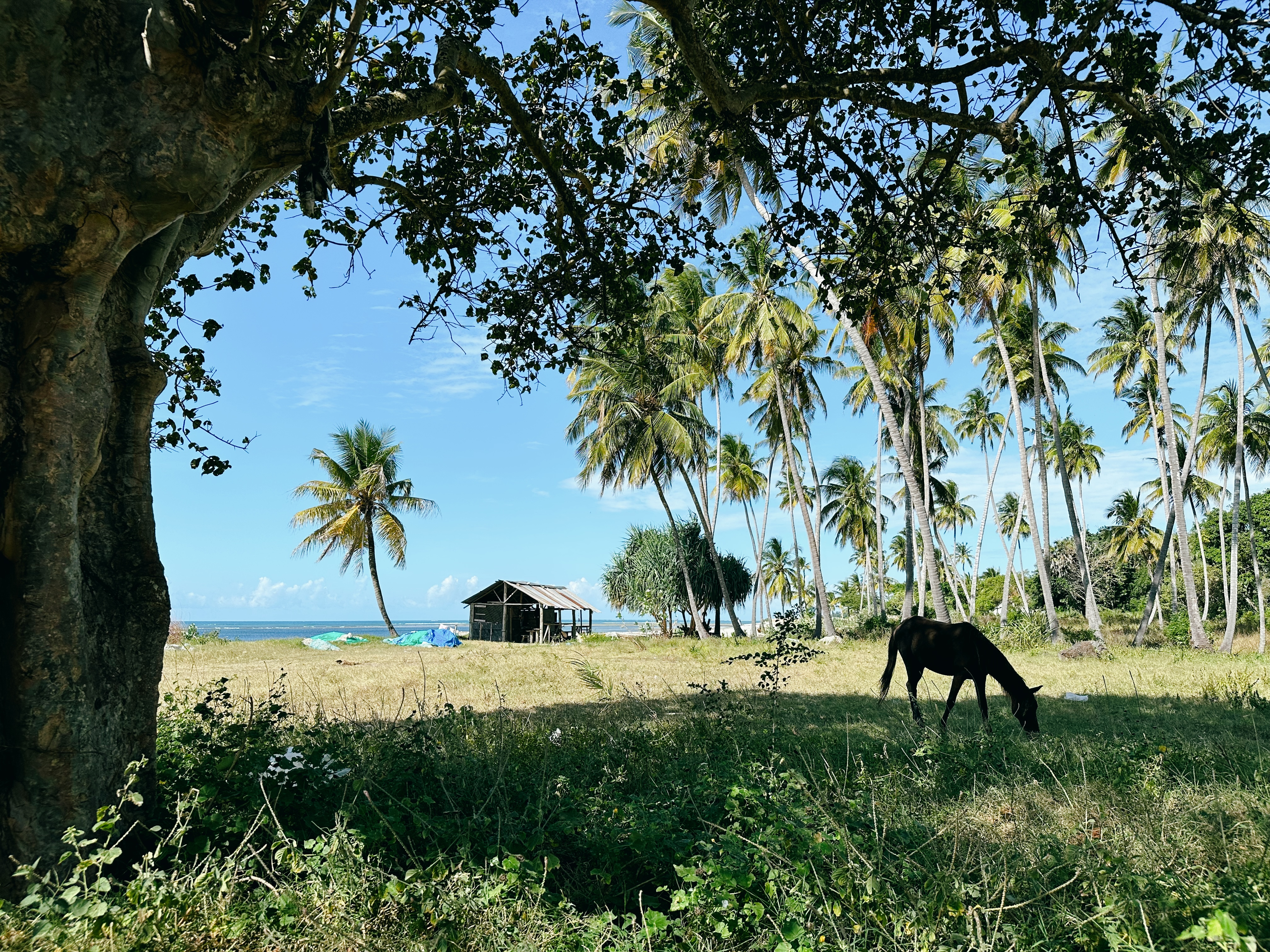
- From top to bottom: Houses in Somangila, Historic Mbuamaji located in Somangila & horses near the ocean in Gezaulole next to Mbuamaji
- Nickname: Kigamboni's seat
- Location within Tanzania
- Coordinates: 6°53′42.72″S 39°28′46.92″E
- Country: Tanzania
- Region: Dar es Salaam Region
- District: Kigamboni District

Area
  - Total: 106.3 km^{2} (41.0 sq mi)

Population (2012)
  - Total: 19,283
- Demonym: Somagilan

Ethnic groups
  - Settler: Swahili
  - Ancestral: Zaramo
- Tanzanian Postal Code: 17102

Somangila (Kata ya Somangila, in Swahili) is an administrative ward and district capital of the Kigamboni District of the Dar es Salaam Region in Tanzania. The Indian Ocean borders the ward to the north, Kimbiji to the south and Kisarawe II on the southwest. The ward is home to Mbuamaji and Mbutu Bandarini historic sites. According to the 2012 census, the ward has a total population of 19,283.

== Administration ==
The postal code for Somagila Ward is 17102. The ward is divided into the following neighborhoods (Mitaa)/ Villages (Vitongoji):

- Bamba
- Dege
- Kichangani
- Kizani
- Malimbika
- Mbwamaji or Mbuamaji
- Minondo

- Mkwajuni, Somangila
- Mwanzo Mgumu
- Mwera, Somangila
- Sara
- Shirikisho
- Visikini

=== Government ===
The ward, like every other ward in the country, has local government offices based on the population served.The Somangila Ward administration building houses a court as per the Ward Tribunal Act of 1988, including other vital departments for the administration the ward. The ward has the following administration offices:

- Somangila Ward Police Station
- Somangila Ward Government Office (Afisa Mtendaji, Kata ya Somangila)
- Somangila Ward Tribunal (Baraza La Kata) is a Department inside Ward Government Office

In the local government system of Tanzania, the ward is the smallest democratic unit. Each ward is composed of a committee of eight elected council members which include a chairperson, one salaried officer (with no voting rights), and an executive officer. One-third of seats are reserved for women councillors.

== Economy ==
The Somagila ward is home to the Kigomboni Municipal Office, The Office of the District Commissioner, and many other local government offices. Health is one of the most important businesses in the ward, as the Kigamboni District Health Center is located there. In addition, there is an Islamic beach and tourist resorts located there as tourism is the second biggest employer in the ward.

== Demographics ==
Like most of the district, the ward is the ancestral home of the Zaramo people. The ward has evolved into a cosmopolitan ward as the city has grown over the years. In 2012, the ward had a total population of 19,283.

== Education and health ==
=== Education ===
The ward is home to these educational institutions:

- Heri fanaka Primary School
- Mbutu Primary School
- Gomvu Primary School
- Daarul-Arqam Primary School
- Somangila Secondary School
- Dar es Salaam Baptist Secoundary School
- Kigamboni City College of Health and Allied Services, Somangila

=== Healthcare ===
The ward is home to the following health institutions:

- Kigamboni District Hospital
- Gezaulole Health Center
- Arafa Anne Dispensary
