= TIPER =

Coordinates: 6°50′39″S 39°18′42″E

TIPER (oil terminal)
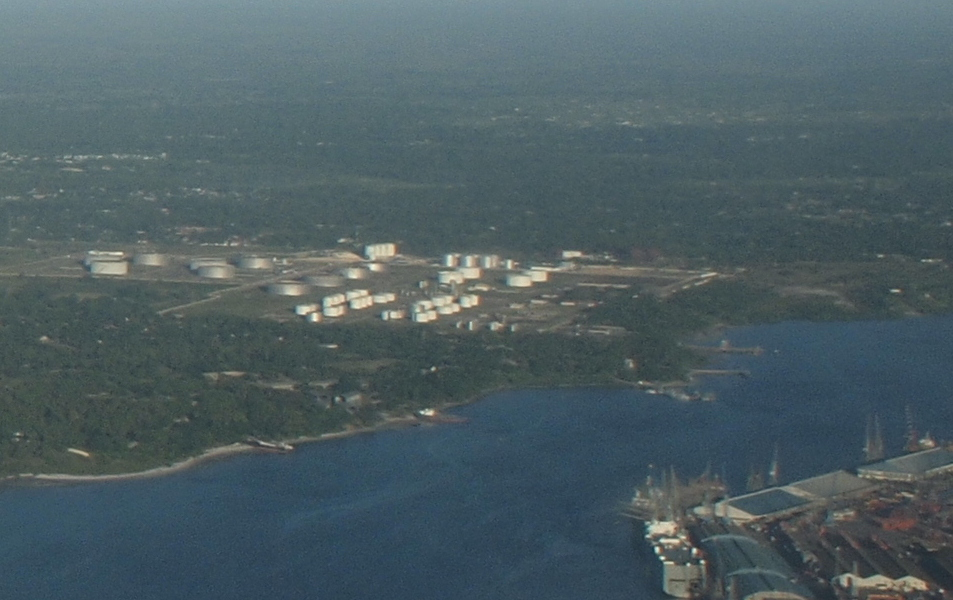
- Industry: Tank farm
- Founded: 1999
- Headquarters: Dar es Salaam, Tanzania
- Key people: Abdulkarim Mruma (chairman); Daniel Belair (MD)
- Total equity: TSh 100 million (2004)
- Owner: GoT / Oryx Energies (50%)

The Tanzania International Petroleum Reserves Limited (TIPER) is a joint venture between the Government of Tanzania (GoT) and Oryx Energies. It operates the largest oil terminal in the country, and will have a storage capacity of 213,200 m^{3} by 2015.

The terminal is located at Kigamboni, opposite the Port of Dar es Salaam.

== History ==
TIPER (BULK STORAGE)
- Location: Kigamboni, Dar es Salaam, Tanzania

Refinery details
- Owner: GoT / Agip (50% each)
- Opened: 1966
- Closed: 1999

Born out of the ancient AGIP Refinery and originally built in 1966, TIPER is now a vast storage terminal for petroleum products. After the closure of the refinery in 2000, the facilities that remained underwent major rehabilitation and improvement. TIPER enjoys a Bonded Warehouse Status. Which is key in attracting storage of large volumes of petroleum products. Stored products can be distributed to the domestic market, exported to neighboring countries or even re-exported by ship. TIPER is jointly owned by the Tanzanian Government and the Geneva based Oryx Oil & Gas Group, who are also responsible for the facilities management. A team of 61 experienced staff ensure constant customer satisfaction.

The plant was commissioned as an oil refinery in the 1960s. It was then known as the Tanzanian and Italian Petroleum Refinary Limited (TIPER), owned jointly by the GoT and Agip (Tanzania) Limited. After the signing of the agreement in 1963, it was built by the Italian state-owned Eni between February 1965 and June 1966 at a cost of TSh 100 million. In 1969, the GoT purchased half of the shares. It was a small refinery with a capacity to process 600,000 tonnes per annum.

Prior to the liberalisation of the petroleum industry in 1997, TIPER produced 30 percent of the local requirements and the rest was imported by the state-owned Tanzania Petroleum Development Corporation (TPDC).

In 1991, under pressure from the International Monetary Fund (IMF), operations ceased at the refinery to implement the country's Structural Adjustment Program. The IMF argued that it was operating at 60% of its capacity.

In 1999, Swiss based Oryx Energies acquired Agip's assets in Tanzania.

In 2012, the GoT was considering using the oil terminal as part of its national strategic petroleum reserve.

In November 2014, the government as the silent partner, suggested that the firm be led by an independent team. Oryx Energies disagreed. The firm expects to build new storage tanks and thereby increase its capacity by an additional 100,000 m^{3}.

== Corporate affairs ==
Fiscal year: 1 January to 31 December
(amount in TSh million)	2009	2010	2011	2012	2013	2014
Earnings before interest and taxes (EBIT)					8,800	TBA
Corporation tax					2,740	
Dividends (to GoT)	1,300	1,000	2,000	1,000	1,275	
Sources						

== See also ==
- Tazama Pipeline
