= Yuch'in-class landing craft =

Chinese landing craft

Class overview
- Name: Type 068 and Type 069
- Builders: Kailing Shipyard, Zhoushan; Shanghai
- Operators: People's Liberation Army Navy; Bangladesh Navy; Tanzania Naval Command
- Built: 1962 - c. 1995
- In commission: c. 1960 - present

General characteristics
- Type: Landing craft mechanized
- Displacement: 86 tonnes (full load)
- Length: 24.8 metres (81 ft)
- Beam: 5.2 metres (17 ft)
- Draught: 1.3 metres (4 ft 3 in)
- Propulsion: 2 x Type 12V 150C diesel engines; 2 shafts; Total output: 600 hp (450 kW)
- Speed: 11.5 knots (21.3 km/h; 13.2 mph)
- Range: 450 nautical miles (830 km; 520 mi) at 11.5 knots (21.3 km/h; 13.2 mph)
- Troops: 150 troops
- Complement: 12
- Armament: 2 x twin 14.5 mm machine guns

The Type 068 and Type 069 (NATO reporting name: Yuch'in or Yuqin) are classes of landing craft mechanized (LCM) of the People's Republic of China's People's Liberation Army Navy (PLAN). They may be based on the Soviet T-4 landing craft, or smaller versions of the Type 067 landing craft with shorter tank and longer poop decks. The Type 068 and Type 069 were mainly designed to transport cargo and personnel respectively.

The landing craft were built at Shanghai from 1962 to 1972. A few modified Type 069s were built at Zhoushan for Tanzania in the 1990s.

== Operators ==
Bangladesh

Bangladesh bought six of the landing craft from China. Two Type 069s were fitted as inshore survey craft and entered service in 1983. Four Type 068s were delivered in 1986. The 1991 Bangladesh cyclone severely damaged two Type 068s, one of which was scrapped.

China

Tanzania

Tanzania bought two modified Type 069s for logistics support. They were launched from the Kailing Shipyard and delivered in 1995. They have greater molded depth for increased cargo capacity, air conditioning and improved steering.

== Sources ==
- Saunders, Stephan, ed. (2015). Jane's Fighting Ships 2015-2016. Jane's Information Group. ISBN 978-0710631435.
- Wertheim, Eric (2013). The Naval Institute Guide to Combat Fleets of the World: Their Ships, Aircraft, and Systems (16 ed.). Annapolis, Maryland: Naval Institute Press. ISBN 978-1591149545.
