= Kimbiji =

Ward of the Kigamboni District in the Dar es Salaam Region of Tanzania

Kimbiji Kata ya Kimbiji (Swahili)
- Ward of Kigamboni District
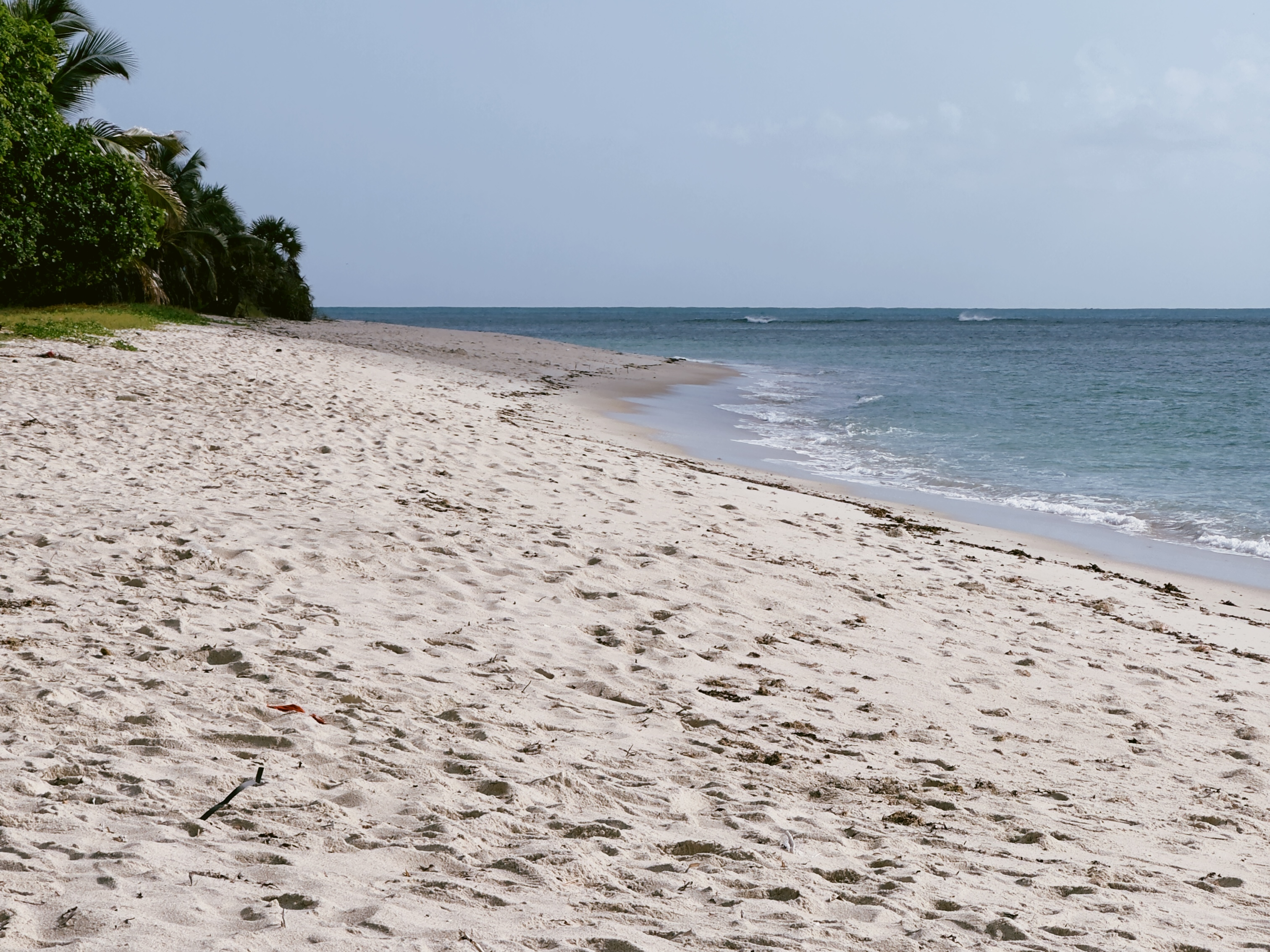
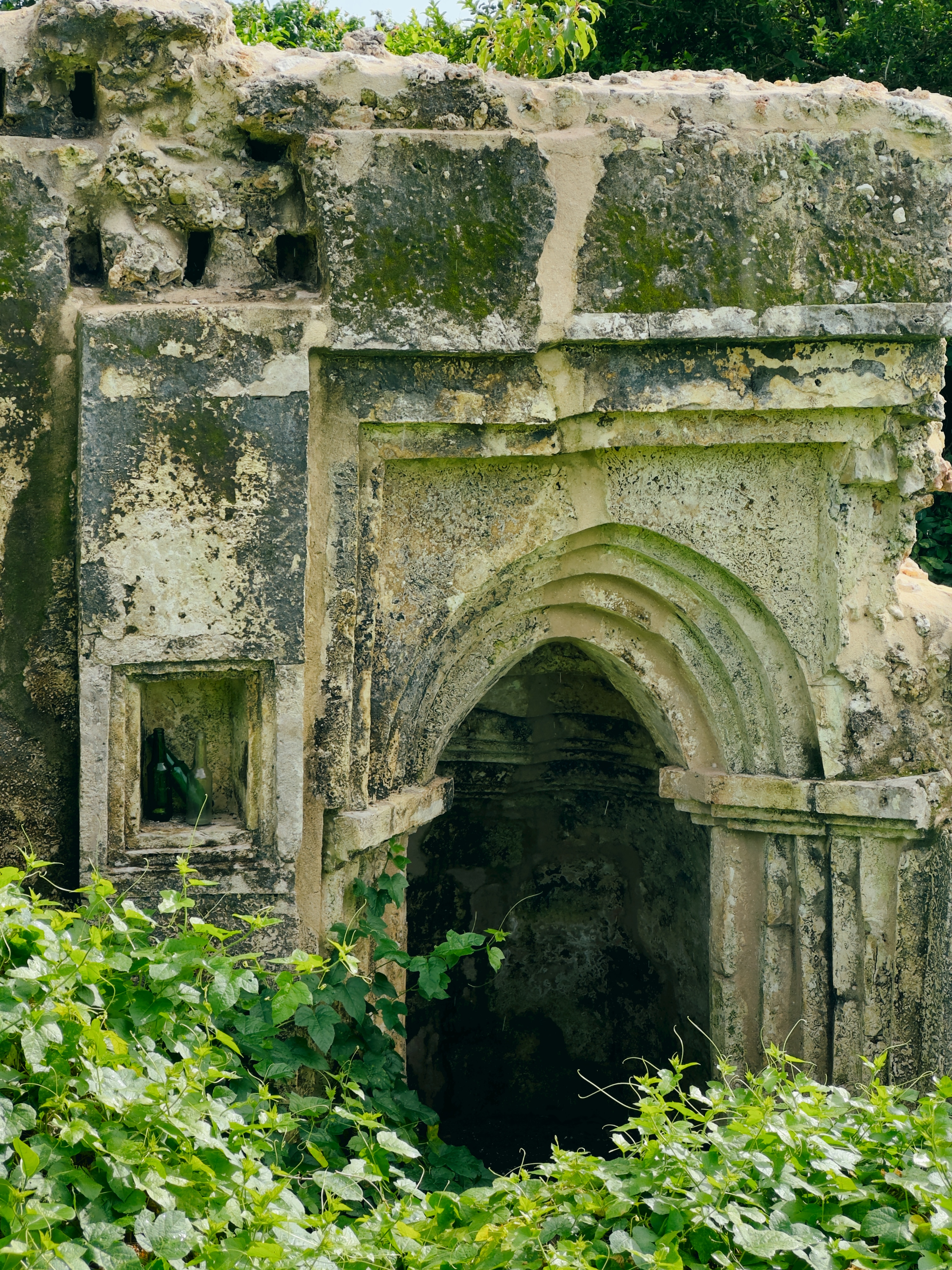
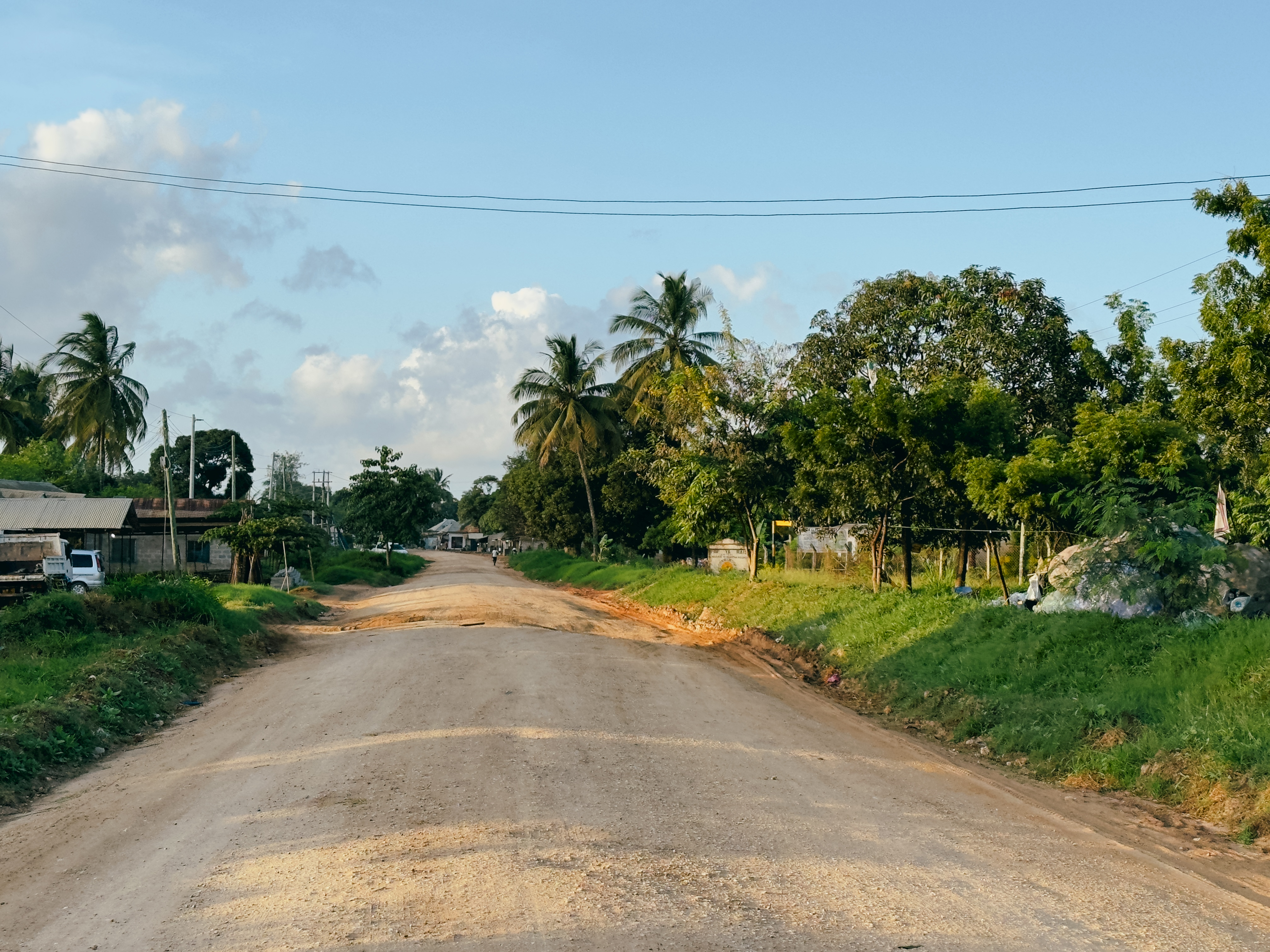
- From top to bottom: Beach in Kimbiji ward, Historic Kimbiji Ruins & town scene in Kimbiji
- Nickname: The historic ward
- Interactive map of Kimbiji
- Coordinates: 6°59′31.92″S 39°31′52.68″E
- Country: Tanzania
- Region: Dar es Salaam Region
- District: Kigamboni District

Area
  - Total: 59.3 km^{2} (22.9 sq mi)

Population (2012)
  - Total: 6,411

Ethnic groups
  - Settler: Swahili
  - Ancestral: Zaramo
- Tanzanian Postal Code: 17101

Kimbiji (Swahili: Kata ya Kimbiji) is an administrative ward in the Kigamboni district of the Dar es Salaam Region of Tanzania. The Indian Ocean borders the ward on its eastern side. Pembamnazi to the south and Kisarawe II to the west form its borders. The ward is bordered by Somangila to the north. The ward is home to the Kimbiji Ruins a National Historic Site. Kimbiji is named after said Medieval Swahili settlement in the ward. According to the 2002 census, the ward has a total population of 6,411.

== Administration ==
The postal code for Kimbiji Ward is 17101. The ward is divided into the following neighborhoods (Mitaa)/Villages (Vitongoji):

- Golani
- Kijaka
- Kizito Huonjwa

- Kwa Chale
- Mikenge
- Ngobanya

=== Government ===
The ward, like every other ward in the country, has local government offices based on the population served.The Kimbiji Ward administration building houses a court as per the Ward Tribunal Act of 1988, including other vital departments for the administration the ward. The ward has the following administration offices:

- Kimbiji Ward Police Station
- Kimbiji Ward Government Office (Afisa Mtendaji)
- Kimbiji Ward Tribunal (Baraza La Kata) is a Department inside Ward Government Office

In the local government system of Tanzania, the ward is the smallest democratic unit. Each ward is composed of a committee of eight elected council members which include a chairperson, one salaried officer (with no voting rights), and an executive officer. One-third of seats are reserved for women councillors.

== Demographics ==
Like much of the district, the ward is the ancestral home of the Zaramo people. The ward evolved into a cosmopolitan ward as the city progressed over time. 6,411 people lived in the ward as a whole in 2012.

== Education and health ==
=== Education ===
The ward is home to these educational institutions:

- Kimbiji Primary School
- Kijaka Primary School
- Kwa Chale Primary School, Kibada
- Destine Primary School, Kibada
- Bohari Primary School
- Idian Primary School
- Kimbiji Secondary School

=== Healthcare ===
The ward is home to the following health institutions:

- Kimbiji Health Center

== See also ==
- Historic Swahili Settlements
