= Pembamnazi =

Ward of the Kigamboni District in the Dar es Salaam Region of Tanzania

Pembamnazi Kata ya Pembamnazi (Swahili)
- Ward of Kigamboni District
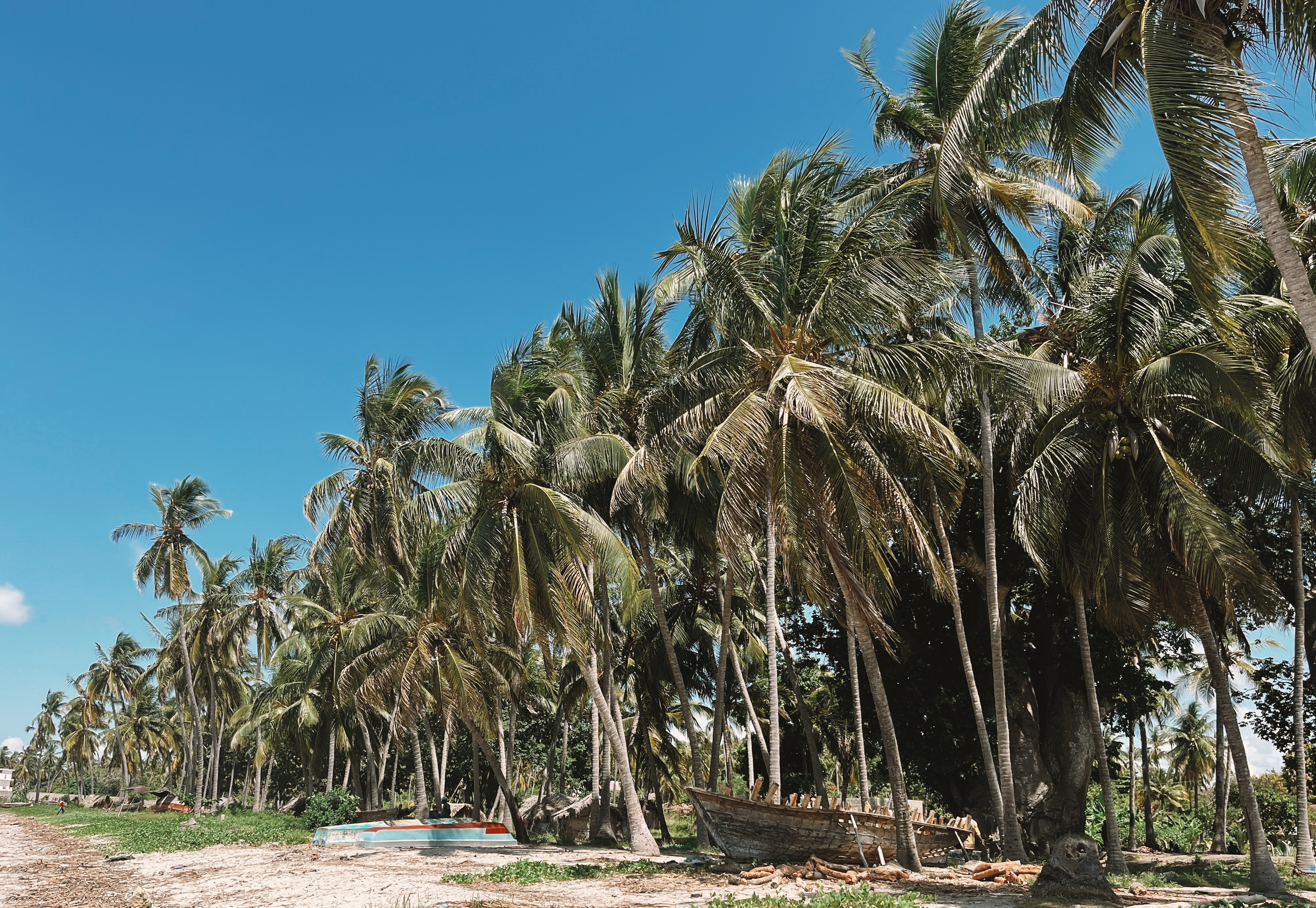
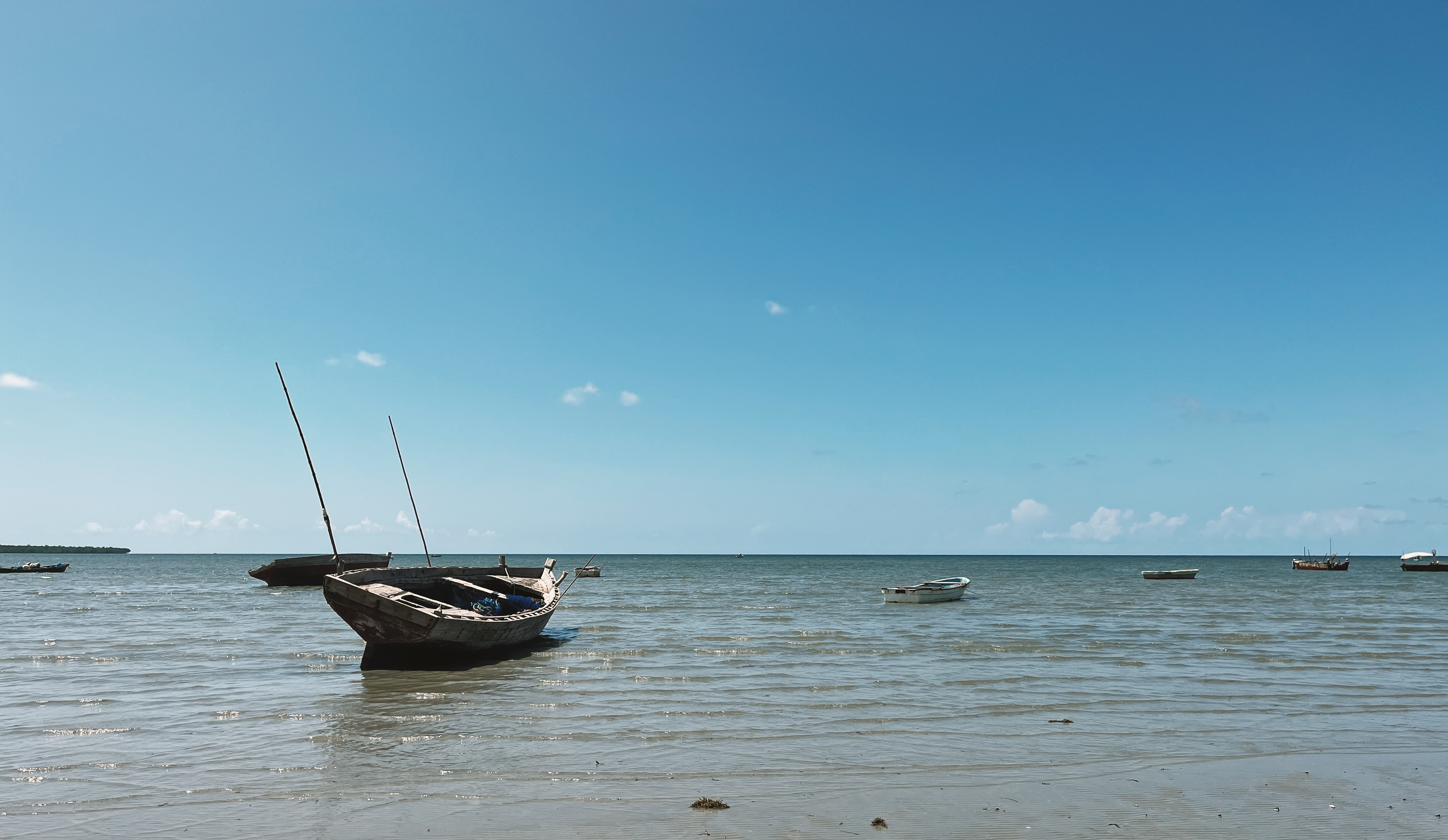
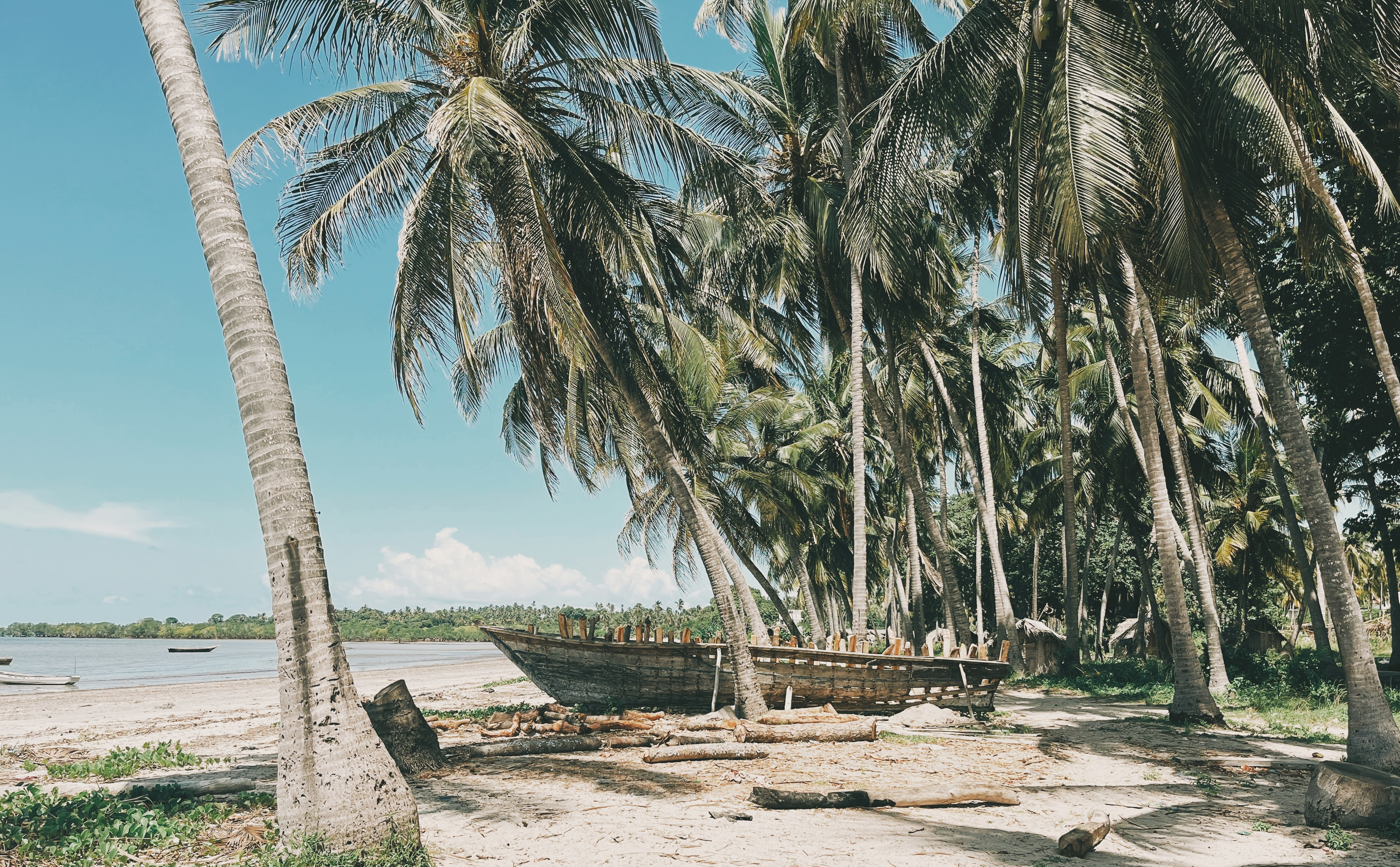
- From top to bottom: Scene at Pembamnazi ward, Boat at Buyuni town in Pembamnazi ward, Buyuni beach at Pembamnazi
- Nickname: The gem of Kigamboni
- Interactive map of Pembamnazi
- Coordinates: 7°5′49.92″S 39°26′10.32″E
- Country: Tanzania
- Region: Dar es Salaam Region
- District: Kigamboni District
- Headquarters: Buyuni

Area
  - Total: 209 km^{2} (81 sq mi)

Population (2012)
  - Total: 9,672

Ethnic groups
  - Settler: Swahili
  - Ancestral: Zaramo
- Tanzanian Postal Code: 17105

Pembamnazi, also known as Pemba Mnazi, (Kata ya Pembamnazi, in Swahili) is an administrative ward in the Kigamboni district of Dar es Salaam Region in Tanzania. The Indian Ocean forms the ward's eastern and southern boundaries. The Pwani Region's Mkuranga District's Shungubweni and Vianzi Wards are to the west. The ward is bordered to the north by the wards of Kisarawe II and Kimbiji. In 2016 the Tanzania National Bureau of Statistics report there were 12,112 people in the ward, from 9,672 in 2012.

== Administration ==
The postal code for Pembamnazi Ward is 17105. The ward is divided into the following neighborhoods (Mitaa)/Villages (Vitongoji):

- Buyuni Center
- Chambewa
- Gulubwida
- Kibungo
- Kichangani
- Kwa Morisi
- Mahenge
- Mtimweupe

- Muhimbili, Pembamnazi
- Nyange
- Pemba Center
- Potea
- Pu Center
- Songani Center
- Tundwi Center

=== Government ===
The ward, like every other ward in the country, has local government offices based on the population served.The Pembamnazi Ward administration building houses a court as per the Ward Tribunal Act of 1988, including other vital departments for the administration the ward. The ward has the following administration offices:

- Pembamnazi Ward Police Station
- Pembamnazi Ward Government Office (Afisa Mtendaji)
- Pembamnazi Ward Tribunal (Baraza La Kata) is a Department inside Ward Government Office

In the local government system of Tanzania, the ward is the smallest democratic unit. Each ward is composed of a committee of eight elected council members which include a chairperson, one salaried officer (with no voting rights), and an executive officer. One-third of seats are reserved for women councillors.

== Demographics ==
Like much of the district, the ward is the ancestral home of the Zaramo people. The ward evolved into a cosmopolitan ward as the city progressed over time. 9,672 people lived in the ward as a whole in 2012.

== Education and health ==
=== Education ===
The ward is home to these educational institutions

- Pembamnazi Primary School
- Pembamnazi Secondary School
- Yale yale Puna Primary School

=== Healthcare ===
The ward is home to the following health institutions:

- Tundwi Songani Health Center
- Pembamnazi Health Center
- Yale Yale Puna Health Center
