= Kigamboni District =

District of Dar es Salaam Region

Kigamboni District Halimashauri ya Manispaa ya Kigamboni (Swahili)
- District of Dar es Salaam
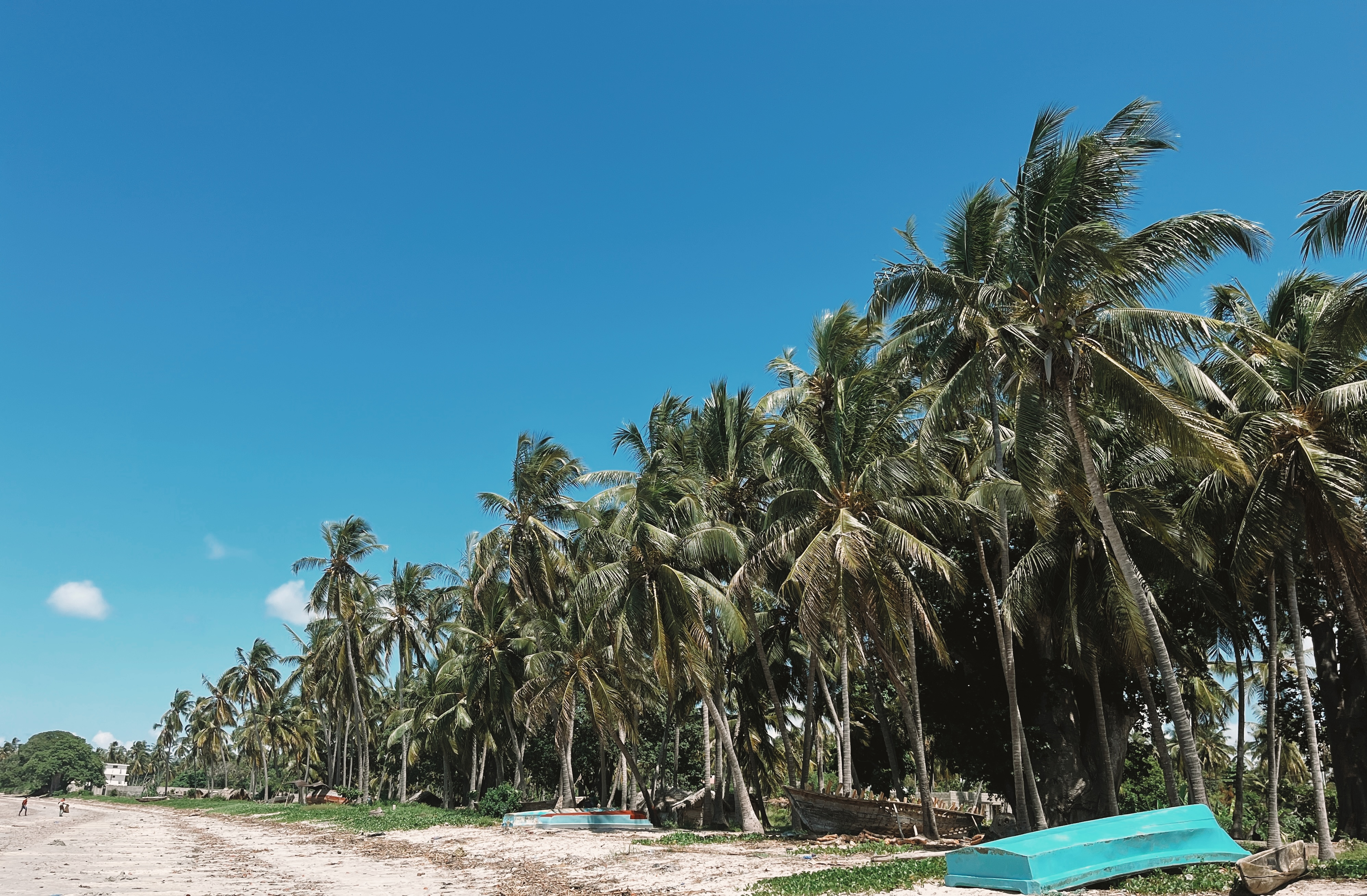
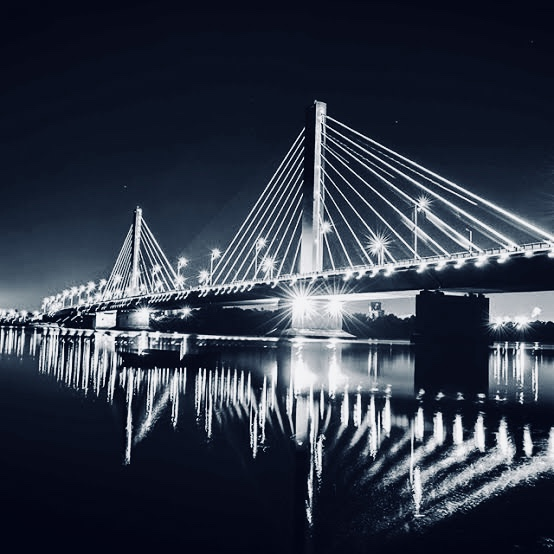
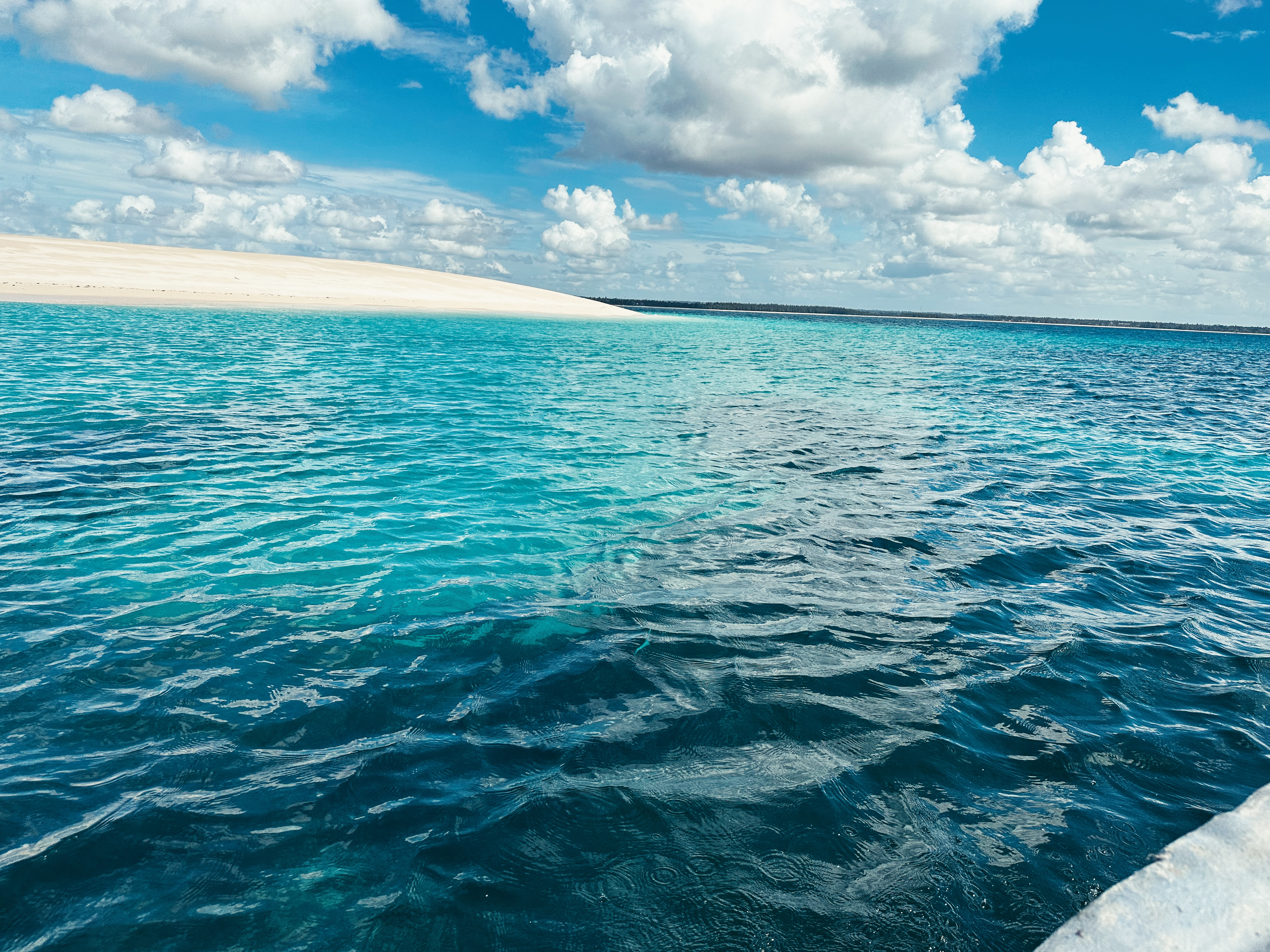
- From top to bottom: beachscape in Pembamnazi ward, Nyerere Bridge & clear waters of Sinda Island of Kigamboni
- Nickname: The holiday district
- Kigamboni District in Dar
- Coordinates: 6°49′S 39°19′E
- Country: Tanzania
- Region: Dar es Salaam Region
- District: 6 November 2015
- Named for: Kigamboni ward
- Capital: Somangila

Area
  - Total: 578.3 km^{2} (223.3 sq mi)
  - Rank: 1st in Dar
- Highest elevation (Kisarawe II): 290 m (950 ft)

Population (2022 census)
  - Total: 317,902
  - Rank: 5th in Dar
  - Density: 549.7/km^{2} (1,424/sq mi)
- Demonym: Ilalan

Ethnic groups
  - Settler: Swahili
  - Native: Zaramo
- Time zone: UTC+3 (EAT)
- Tanzanian Postcode: 171
- Website: Official website
- Symbols of Tanzania
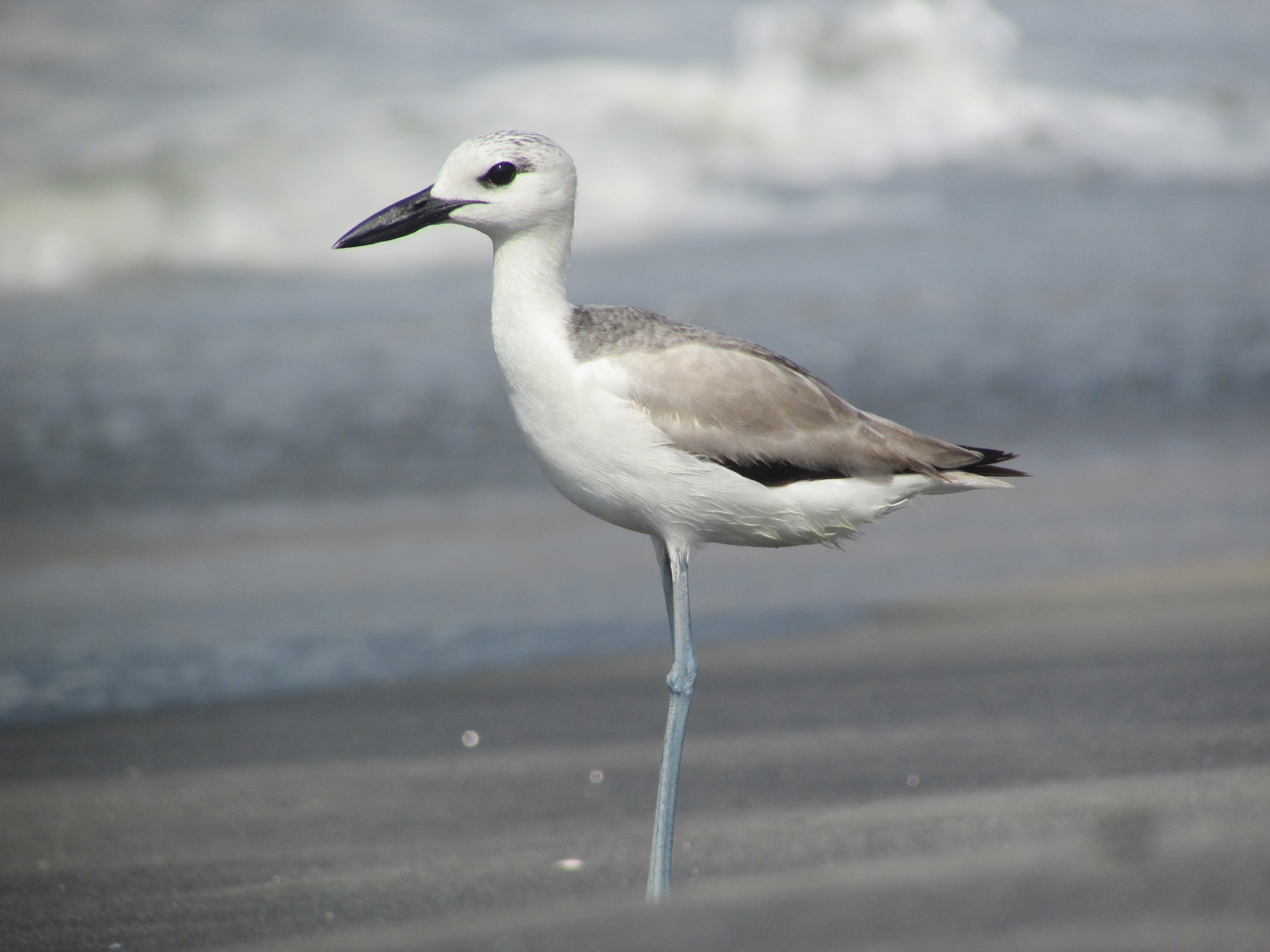
- Bird: Crab plover

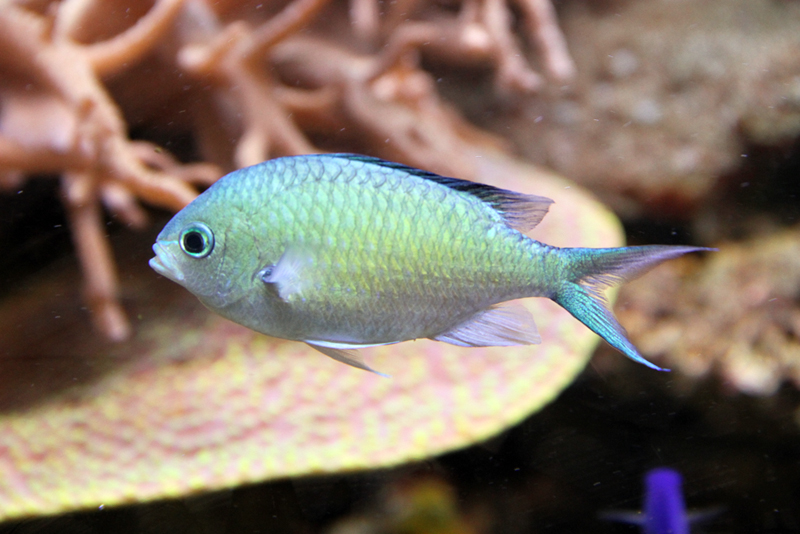
- Fish: Chromis viridis

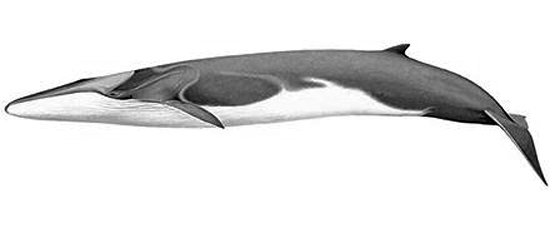
- Mammal: Fin whale

Kigamboni District, officially known as The Kigamboni Municipal Council (Halimashauri ya Manispaa ya Kigamboni, in Swahili) is one of five districts of the Dar es Salaam Region of Tanzania. The district is bordered to the north by Ilala District, to the east by the Indian Ocean, the west by Temeke District, and to the south by the Mkuranga District of Pwani Region. It covers an area of 578.3 km^{2} (223.3 sq mi), making it the largest district the region by area. The district is comparable in size to the land area of Micronesia. The administrative seat is Somangila. The district is home to the headquarters of the Tanzanian Navy, The Kigamboni Naval Base. Also the district is home to the prestigious Mwalimu Nyerere Memorial Academy. In addition the district is one of two districts in Dar es Salaam that has a National Historic Site, with Kigamboni hosting the most, namely the Kimbiji Ruins, Mbutu Bandarini and Mbuamaji historic sites. The 2012 National Tanzania Census states the population for Kigamboni as 162,932.

== Administration ==
Kigamboni Municipal Council is divided into three sections on an administrative level. Additionally, these divisions are subdivided into 67 subwards (referred to as "Mitaa") by 9 wards. There are 15 councilors in the municipal council, and two of them are lawmakers.

1. Tungi
2. Vijibweni
3. Kimbiji
4. Kisarawe II
5. Kigamboni, Kigamboni District
6. Mjimwema
7. Kibada
8. Somangila
9. Pembamnazi

== History ==
The Zaramo initially colonised the area that is now Kigamboni. Later, they were influenced and some of them settled in Swahili communities in settlements like Mbuamaji, Kimbiji, Old Mjimwema, and Mbutu Bandarini all located in the district. In 2015 the Temeke Municipal Council was divided into Temeke Municipal Council and Kigamboni Municipal Council in order to create Kigamboni Municipal Council. The council was established in 2015 and instructed to begin operations in April 2016 by the Government Notes (GN) Number 512 of 6 November 2015. The establishment was carried out in accordance with Sections 8 and 9 of the 1982 Local Government (Urban Authorities) Act No. 8.

== Geography ==
Kigamboni Municipal Council covers an area of 577.86 km2, or 57,786.8 hectares, and has a 65 km long coastline. It is one of Dar es Salaam City's biggest municipal councils. With a height of 20 to 50 meters above sea level and a large portion of flat land, Kigamboni Municipal Council is made up of swampy areas in the center and close by shorelines. When compared to other wards, Pembamnazi Ward has the largest land area with 209 km squared, while Kigamboni Ward has the smallest at 4 km squared.

=== Geology ===
Geological formations from the Neogene, Quaternary, and Recent deposits cover Kigamboni. The Neogene deposits are composed of pure sand, clay, and limestone in some areas and sandy clay and clayey sand in others. Most of the soil is sandy clay interspersed with worn limestone. However, the geology beneath appears to be characterized by calcareous sand and sandy clay intercalated with limestone, according to drill data currently available.

=== Climate ===
Kigamboni's climate is tropical, with high temperatures, light breezes, high humidity, and no distinct cold season. Kigamboni District experiences temperatures that range from 18 °C in July to 32 °C in February. With a mean daily range of only 4 °C, the average yearly temperature is 26 °C. The mean seasonal range is only about 4 °C, with only minor seasonal variations.

The average daily maximum humidity in Kigamboni is 96 percent at dawn, while the average daily low humidity is 67 percent in the afternoons. Between March and May, there is substantial rainfall in the municipality, while there is moderate rainfall from November through December. However, rainfall patterns are incredibly erratic and varied. The temperature fluctuates between 18 °C and 32 °C, and there is over 1000 mm of annual rainfall. Prior to the start of the rainy season, in September/October and January/February, respectively, the temperatures reach their highest points. The majority of the year, the winds are from the east to the west, and the rains typically stop in early June.

The region's wind patterns are characteristic of the Western Indian Ocean's wind regime, which is defined by north-easterly winds (NE monsoons) from November to March and south-easterly winds (SE monsoons) from June to October. The region's wind speeds, which range from 1.4 to 7.8 m/s, are very low. The SSE and SE monsoons are often very powerful, reaching their heights in April and July. Peak speed for the lighter northern monsoons is in February. An almost complete clockwise current system that adapts its characteristics to the shifting wind is combined with this wind system.

Wind speeds in Kigamboni during the northeast monsoons range from 1.4 to 7.8 m/s. The wind picks up during the southeast monsoons, reaching a peak of about 8 m/s. Both seasons have a strong southerly breeze, which is a common wind direction in the East African region.

=== Topography and vegetation ===
Kigamboni's landscape is undulating, like that of many other areas of the Dar es Salaam Region. The plains, which are flat to slightly sloping, were built on an old alluvial terrace. In wards near the coast, the terrain rises from sea level to a maximum of 120m above mean sea level in a few locations in the Kisarawe II and Kibada wards. In places like Kimbiji Ward, the majority of Kigamboni is between 20 and 50 meters above sea level. The low lying sections in the wards of Vijibweni, Kigamboni, Tungi, Mjimwema, Somangira, and Pembamnazi range in height from 1 to 25 meters.

The land is located in the Municipality's Migombani sections near flood plains. Gardening and other urban agricultural pursuits are feasible on the land. But the region is distinguished by haphazard settlements that are vulnerable to flash flooding. Kisarawe II, Amani Gomvu, Kimbiji, and Chekeni Mwasonga's southern lowlands. Sandy soil covers the majority of the area. Mangrove trees, Miombo woodland, coastal marshes, and coastal shrubs make up the majority of the area's natural vegetation.

=== Rivers, islands and Lakes ===
Water bodies in Kigamboni Municipal include the ocean, streams, rivers, wetlands, and swamps. The eastern (Kigamboni, Tungi and Vijibweni Wards), western (Somangila, Kimbiji and Pembamnazi Ward), and northern (Mjimwema, Kigamboni and Tungi Ward) portions of Kigamboni Municipal are all flanked by the Indian Ocean. The names of the three large wetlands are Ubaka (Tungi), Boko or Chaboko (Vijibweni), and Mjimwema and Kimambani (Mjimwema), and they are located in the wards of Tungi, Vijibweni, and Mjimwema. There are two significant wetlands in Kigamboni Municipality; the first is in Somangila, while the second connects Kimbiji and Pembemnazi. Rivers in Kigamboni District are Mwera River, Mbalajangi River, Mumani River, Potea River Kidete River, Nguva River, Pumbweni River, Ukoni River, Mbaranyange River, Mkomosi River, Msinga River and Shungu River. Islands in Kigamboni are Latham Island, Kimbubu Island, Kendwa Island, Sinda Island and Makatumbi Islands. The latter three are protected under the Dar es Salaam Marine Reserve (DMRS).

It has five major rivers located in the district: the Mwera River, Ukooni River, Mbalajangi River, Mumani River, and Potea River, which are located in the Kisarawe II and Mjimwema wards, Kisarawe II, and Somangila wards, respectively. There are 84 artificial ponds for fish spread over many wards in the district.

== Economy ==
Farming is the second-largest economic activity after commerce and trade, and it makes a substantial economic contribution to the Kigamboni Municipal Council. Small-scale farmers run the industry, and the majority of them engage in subsistence farming to ensure their existence by relying mostly on rain-fed agriculture. The yield per hectare is hence quite poor. The council prioritizes food crops such as cassava, maize, pads, legumes, and various kinds of fruits including mangoes and watermelons, according to agronomical considerations.

=== Infrastructure ===
Roads and water (ferries) are the two primary modes of transportation used by the Kigamboni Municipality to connect it to neighboring Dar es Salaam Municipalities. In contrast to the ferry that connects Kigamboni with Kinondoni Municipal, roads connect Kigamboni with Temeke Municipal. The road network is the primary means of transportation in Kigamboni Municipality. According to a government survey report, 76% of residents use roads, including the Nyerere Bridge, while 18% use both roads and ferries and the remaining (6) use water (ferries) solely.

==== Roads ====
The entire length of the road network in the Dar es Salaam Region is 3,861.88 kilometers, of which 700.7 kilometers are tarmac roads. The growth of the road network in terms of road classification is covered in this section. It provides comprehensive data on the length of the road network in the ward or district, its passability, and its length per kind of road surface.

Since it accounts for nearly all traffic flows in Kigamboni, road travel is the preferred method of getting to the Municipality. Only 45.8 km of the 292.7 km of existing roads are paved, while 246.9 km are unpaved. All of the council's roads, bridges, and culverts are important resources, but since the majority of the roads need extensive repairs, huge sums of money are required.

==== Water and sanitation ====
In Kigamboni Municipality, the daily average water demand is 17.4 m3 million (80 liters per person). Government-owned water wells typically have a daily production capacity of 8.89 million m3, or 51.1%. Water sellers, water boozers, and privately owned wells supply the remaining population. The Municipal has 88 deep wells in total, of which 27 are used for public purposes and 61 are owned by public institutions (35 elementary schools, 9 secondary schools, and 17 dispensaries). Water infrastructure shortages, population growth (5.6 growth rate each year), and a subpar water distribution system within the district are the main causes of municipal water scarcity. The majority of Kigamboni people manage waste on-site using either pit latrines or WC systems, according to the data that is currently available. Only 1.4% of homes are connected to the central sewage system.

==== Mass communication ====
Large corporations that have an impact on both the social and economic development of Kigamboni Municipality maintain and oversee the communication network inside the municipality. With more than 60 network towers, the main telecommunications providers in the Municipality include Airtel, Vodacom, Halotel, Tigo, and TTCL. In the Municipality, almost all newspapers and periodicals are distributed. ITV, TBC, Star TV, East Africa Television, DSTV, Azam TV, ZBC, Capital Television, and other international broadcasting companies like CNN, BBC, Sky News, and Aljazeera are just a few of the television stations that are conveniently available in Kigamboni Municipality. In Kigamboni Municipality, there are numerous radio stations available for the community's entertainment and education.

=== Energy ===
In comparison to a peak demand of 18 to 20MW, Kigamboni Municipality's supply capacity to the National Grid is 17MW. A little over 56% of the studied homes have access to the TANESCO electrical network. The remaining 44% rely on solar energy and generators as backup energy sources. 32,735 consumers are currently active, including 42 significant clients and 32,687 lesser ones.

=== Income ===
According to the socioeconomic survey conducted by Ardhi University in October 2018 for the Kigamboni Master Plan, 71% of the citizens in Kigamboni who were interviewed had monthly incomes between TZS 50,000 and 200,000, 28% between TZS 50,000 and 100,000, 21% between TZS 100,000 and 200,000, and 22% between TZS 200,000 and 400,000. Only 15% of the residents who were interviewed have incomes over 400,000 TZS, and 14% have incomes below 50,000 TZS.

According to the findings of the socioeconomic study, 91% of the residents who were questioned had monthly incomes of less than TZS 600,000. Only 8% and 1% of people, respectively, had monthly incomes between TZS 600,000 and TZS 1,500,000. This indicates that the majority of households in KGMC are low income households because it is below the national average, which is 3.8% for the group earning more than TZS 1,500,000.

=== Agriculture ===
There are 21,000 acres of arable land in the District. However, only 4,955.9 ha (23.6%) of the arable land was used to grow food and cash crops in 2016. The maximum usage in the three years was 19,341.94 ha (92.1%) in 2017. But in 2018, cultivation fell to 10,166 ha (48.4%). Subsistence farming, which is typically practiced by peasants (small-holder farmers), is the predominant type of agriculture in the region. These farmers grow a variety of products, including fruits, vegetables, cereals, root crops, and legumes. Coconut and cashew nuts are two additional crops. In 2016, 1,853.4 ha of land was cultivated for food crops, making it the biggest cultivated area, while 869 ha was the smallest.

10,869.6 Mt of fruit were harvested in 2017, a bumper crop cultivated on 8,331.2 hectares. Vegetables were harvested on 6,984.1 ha. Food crop production reached a record 21,691.2 Mt. Since 2016, there has been a constant rise in the production of fruits, a decline in the production of cashew nuts and coconuts, and a boom in the production of food crops (Table 24). In general, crop production increased and reached records in 2016, 2017, and 2018 of 25,338.8 Mt, 33,537.69 Mt, and 42,693.3 Mt, respectively.

In Kigamboni wards, there have been some noticeable changes in the amount of land planted with important food crops between 2014 and 2018. According to Table 3.2, the land area used to produce pads has been decreasing, going from 1,478.5 ha in 2014 to 1,131 ha in 2018. Table 3.2 shows that, in comparison to other wards, Kisarawe II has the largest area for producing pads, which is 370 Ha.

Okra is one of the main crops grown in Kigamboni, albeit the amount of land used for its cultivation has been declining as a result of recent conversions of agricultural property to residential usage. Okra production decreased from 1,846.5 Ha in 2014 to 880 Ha in 2018, as seen in Table 3.3. Kisarawe 2 has the largest area (220 Ha) for cultivating okra in comparison to other wards.

The district grows food crops like maize, paddy, cassava, sweet potatoes, and legumes. In fact, the area used for production is growing, with 1,853.4 ha cultivated in total in 2016, 3,965.64 ha in 2017, and 8,437.0 ha in 2018. All food crops are thus experiencing an increase in production. Sweet potatoes (3,173 Mt) were the main crop produced in 2016, followed by cassava (17,051.0 Mt) in 2017 and 2018.

As a result of the decline in land area, which is mostly responsible for the decline in crop production, pad production has decreased from 1,183.8 tons in 2014 to 903.4 tons in 2018, as shown in Table 3.5. Kisarawe 2 produced the most pads (370 Tons), whereas Vijibweni produced the fewest tons of pads.

The primary cash crops farmed in Kigamboni Municipal Council are a variety of egg plants, watermelon, Chinese cabbages, spinach, tomatoes, and sweet peppers. Since 2014, Kigamboni's okra production has undergone a discernible change. In 2018, 880 tons of okra were produced compared to 1.846.5 tons in 2014. In 2018, Kisarawe II had the most okra production (220 tons), while Kigamboni recorded the lowest production (6 tons).

2019 saw the sale of 3,123,000 kg of maize and okra for TZS 5,621,400,000. A total of TZS 1,296,000,000 worth of maize and okra, totaling 720,000 kg, were sold in Somangila Ward. The Kigamboni ward sold the least amount of maize and okra (56,000 kg), generating a total of 100,800,000 TZS.

Okra, sweet pepper, hot pepper, sweet potato leaves (matembele), Chinese, cabbage, and pumpkin leaves are among the vegetables grown in Kigamboni. Amaranth (Michicha) species were produced in large quantities, with an upward trend from 2016 to 2018. Okra production was also significant in 2018, declining in 2017 and increasing slightly in 2018. A declining tendency was seen in the production of sweet pepper, hot pepper, and sweet potato leaves. The yield of Chinese, cabbage, and pumpkin leaves, on the other hand, increased.

The main fruits grown in Kigamboni are mangoes, watermelons, and cucumbers. However, whilst the output of watermelons increased from 6,204 Mt to 10,290 Mt in 2018, the production of mangoes and cucumbers was on the down. Cashew nuts and coconut are two additional crops grown in the area. Since 2016, less space has been used to grow these crops.

According to the information available, Pembamnazi, Somangila, and Kisarawe II wards are excelling at maintaining livestock. Individual families own most of the livestock that the Kigamboni Municipal Council has. The industry serves as an additional source of revenue. 15,766 cattle, 11,562 goats, 3,451 sheep, 1,296 pigs, and 189,503 poultry were present in 2017. In Kigamboni Municipal in 2019, there were 139,961 chickens (broilers and layers), 42,516 indigenous chickens, 19,925 cattle, 11,562 goats, 3,415 sheep, 1,296 pigs, and 3,415 sheep.

=== Trade and industry ===
A little more than 1.9% of the people who live in Kigamboni Municipal Council are formally employed in commerce, particularly in the unregulated market. They can be found in a number of locations, including the Magogoni and Kigamboni Ferry areas, which have markets, bus stops, parking lots for boda bodas and bajajs, and streets where vendors sell their wares. Also there is an oil refinary TIPER located in the district.

In the Municipality, there are 4,284 formally registered business people, of which 76.4% are situated in the five major market regions (Tuamoyo, Urasa, Ungindoni, Tundwi Songani, and Ferry). However, only the Ferry, Urasa, and Toamoyo marketplaces are flourishing, with Tundwi Songani and Ungindoni still underutilized.

The National Bank of Commerce (NBC), National Micro Finance Bank (NMB), Community and Rural Development Bank (CRDB), Twiga Bank, Dar es Salaam Commercial Bank (DCB), Equity Bank, and Tanzania Postal Bank (TPB) are the seven commercial banks that conduct daily financial transactions, such as money transfers, loan issuance to borrowers, and currency exchange, among others.

The most important small-scale enterprises are those that manufacture bricks, clothes, aluminum, timber, milling machines, bakeries, electrical equipment, and ice blocks. Other options include small businesses that process a variety of culinary items to enhance the value of row agricultural products. In Kigamboni Municipality, there are 365 different kinds of small-scale and 7 medium-scale industries that deal with diverse commodities. About five large industries are represented in the council.

=== Tourism ===
Kigomboni boasts 65 km of coastline, the largest in Dar es Salaam Region. In addition, the Municipality is home to a number of tourism hotspots, including a mangrove forest reserve and the islands of Kendwa, Makatube, Fungu Baraka, and Sinda Island. Also Kigamboni Zoo and holiday resorts along the shoreline.

== Population ==
Kigamboni is the ancestral home of several Ndengereko communities especaill in the south west area of the District as well as the Zaramo people, like the majority of Dar es Salaam. Islam and Christianity were found to be the two main religions in Kigamboni. The findings showed that, with 64.3 percent of the population was Muslim, with Christians making up 35.7 percent.

The council has a total population of 162,932 as per the Population and Housing Census for the year 2012, with 81,199 men and 81,733 women. The projected population for the year 2018 is 225,938, with 112,597 men and 113,341 women, growing at a pace of 5.4% each year. In comparison to other wards, Kigamboni, Vijibweni, and Mjimwema have comparatively significant populations. Comparing Kisarawe II to other wards, it has the smallest population. Kigamboni Municipal is anticipated to have a total population of 238,591 in 2019, consisting of 118,905 men and 119,686 women.

With a population density of 1,733.2 people per square kilometer in Kigamboni ward in 2011, the population of Kigamboni is unequally distributed. Per square kilometer, there were 4 people in Vijibweni, 2381 in Kibada, 177.2 in Kisarawe II, 257.1 in Somangila, 1,481.7 in Kimbiji, 1,219.3 in Pembamnazi, 275.5 in Mjimwema, and 146.7 in Tungi. Based on the aforementioned square kilometers, Kigamboni now occupies an area of 596.3 km2. There are significant variations in population density between the census year of 2012 and the year 2018. There are 379.1 people per square meter on average. Comparing Kibada, Vijibweni, and Kigamboni to other wards like Kisarawe II, Somangila, Mjimwema, and Tungi, these former three have the largest population densities.

According to the data, children under the age of 15 make up 34.7% of the population in Kigamboni Municipal Council, and those over the age of 65 make up 2.2% of the total.

== Health and Education ==
=== Health ===
34 dispensaries are working in the Municipality of Kigamboni, with 19 of them being publicly owned and 15 being privately owned. There is just one hospital running in the Municipality of Kigamboni, which is publicly owned and is situated in Vijibweni. According to the findings, Kigamboni Municipality has to make a deliberate effort to either develop health centers or boost the number of dispensaries. Similar to how they efficiently serve the community, private health institutions in the council need to be expanded. When excluding Assistant Medical Officers, the Municipal had 15 Medical Doctors and 12 Assistant Medical Officers in 2019, with an average patient population per doctor of 15062 (Doctor Patient Ratio: 1:15062). Currently, the national doctor-patient ratio is 1:18982.

Acute diarrhea is the most frequent cause of morbidity in people under the age of five (33%), while hypertension is the leading cause of morbidity in people above the age of five. Neonatal asphyxia, which accounts for 33.3% of deaths in children under the age of five, and head injuries, which account for 11.8% of deaths in children above the age of five, are the two most prevalent diseases. Acute diarrhea is the most frequent cause of morbidity in people under the age of five (33%), while hypertension is the leading cause of morbidity in people above the age of five. Neonatal asphyxia, which accounts for 33.3% of deaths in children under the age of five, and head injuries, which account for 11.8% of deaths in children above the age of five, are the two most prevalent diseases.

=== Education ===
There were 55 primary schools in the Municipal in 2018, with 33 being owned by the government and 22 being privately operated. There were 33,557 students overall in those 55 primary schools in 2019 (17,060 males and 16,479 girls), including in public and private schools. There were 6,761 students in private schools (3,387 boys and 3,374 girls). There were 40,318 students enrolled in both public and private schools. The Kigamboni Municipal Council need 631 instructors, but currently only has 109, leaving a deficit of 522 teachers.

==== Primary school enrollment ====
There was a rise in the number of students enrolled in government primary schools from 26,421 in 2017 to 30,100 in 2019, when examining the total number of students from grade I to VII by sex. In 2017, there were 700 males registered in the Kimbiji Ward and 2,516 boys enrolled in the Mjimwema Ward. There were also 2,598 more girls enrolled in Mjimwema than in Kimbiji. Kimbiji Ward enrolled 778 girls, which was the least amount compared to other wards during the same year, and Mjimwema Ward enrolled the most students overall for both sexes in 2018. Tungi ward enrolled the fewest boys (849 students) in 2018.

2019 saw a maximum enrollment of 3,027 males at Mjimwema Ward and a minimum enrollment of 772 at Kimbiji Ward, although Mjimwema Ward had a higher enrollment of girls than the other wards did that year.

=== Secondary ===
There are a total of 21 secondary schools in Kigamboni Municipal, of which 14 are community-based public secondary schools and 7 are privately owned. The number of secondary schools, both public and private, has not increased for the previous three years in a row, according to the council.In Kigamboni Municipality, there are 14 secondary schools, 11 of which are connected to the national grid and 3 of which use alternate energy sources. In the near future, this council will have 15 government secondary schools, including the new secondary school that is now being constructed in Kigamboni Ward as of 2019.

==== Secondary school enrollment ====
In terms of enrollment in government secondary schools, there were 2,989 students enrolled in secondary education in 2017, 2,829 students enrolled in secondary education in 2018, and 2,840 students enrolled in secondary education in 2019. Table 5.40 shows a reduction in enrollment from 2017 to 2019 for the period of time. In government secondary schools, there were more boy pupils enrolled in 2017 than there were girls, but this scenario changed in 2018 and 2019, when there were more girls enrolled than boys in both years.

== Gallery ==
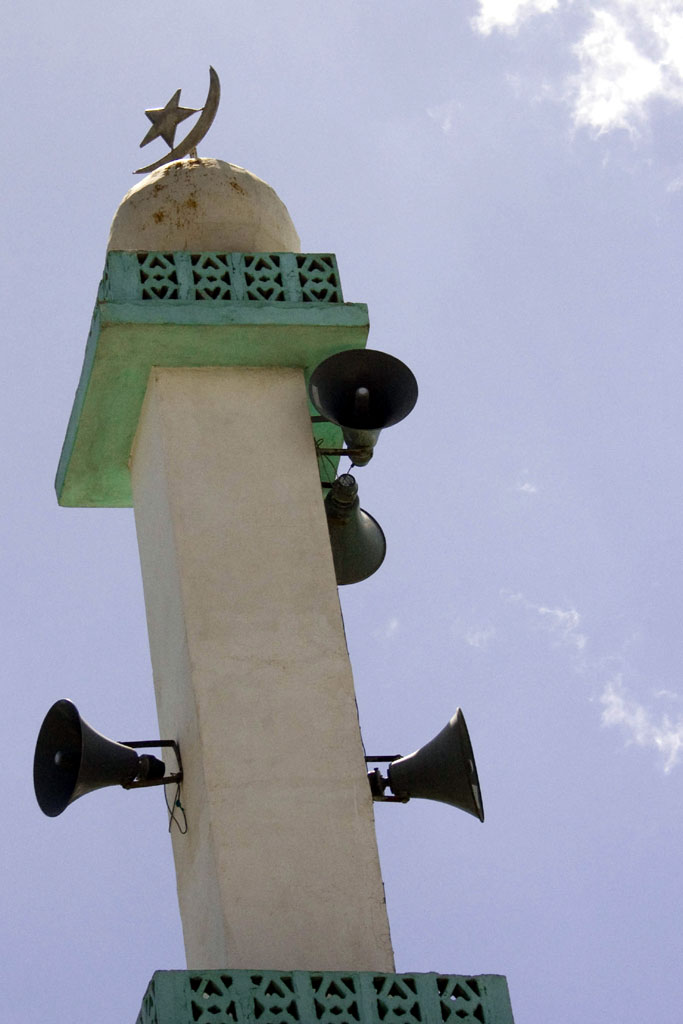
The mosque minaret (used for calling out prayer call (adhan) through the public announcement speakers) of Masjid Annur Ferry within the ward.

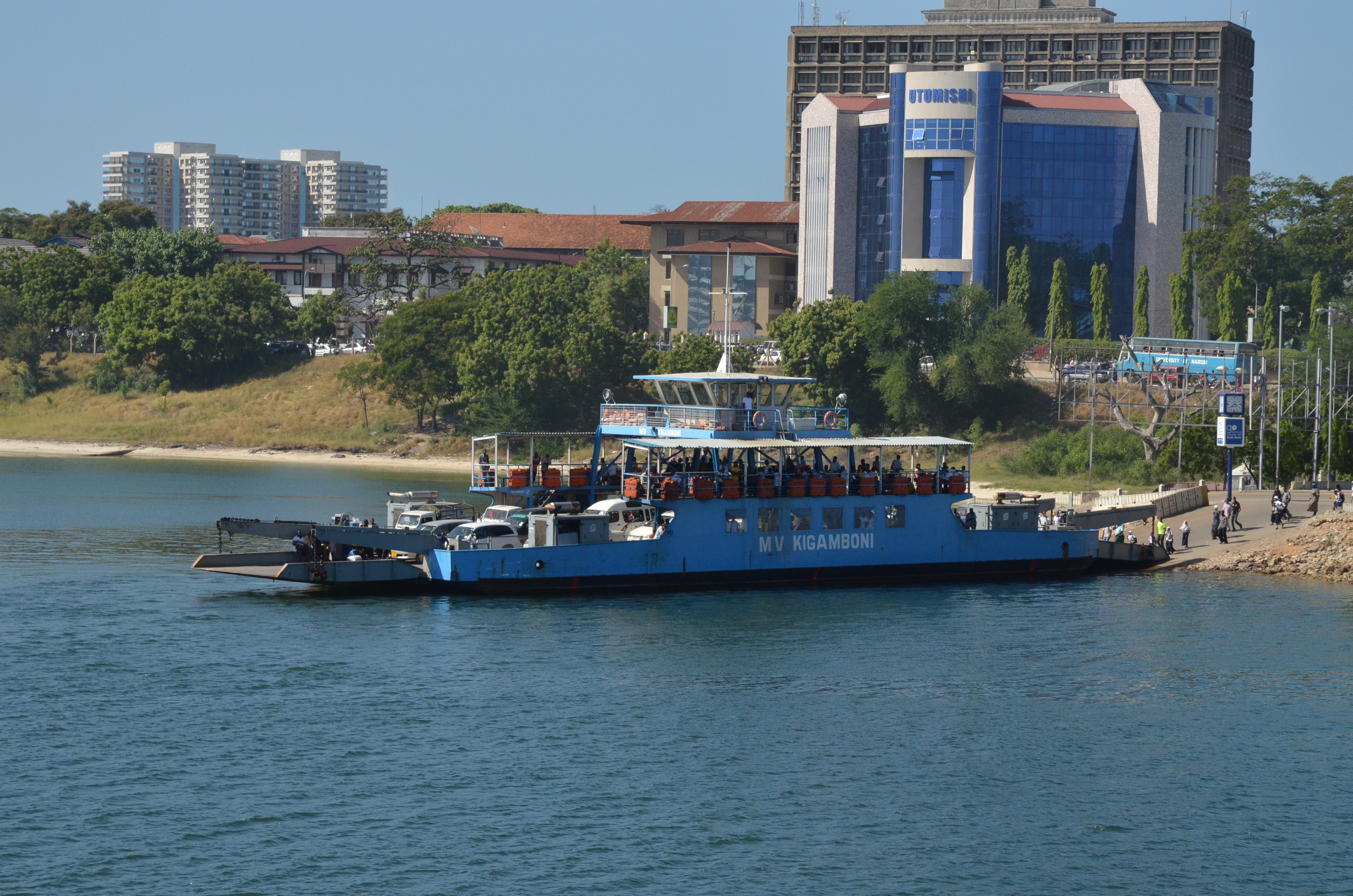
The MV Kigamboni

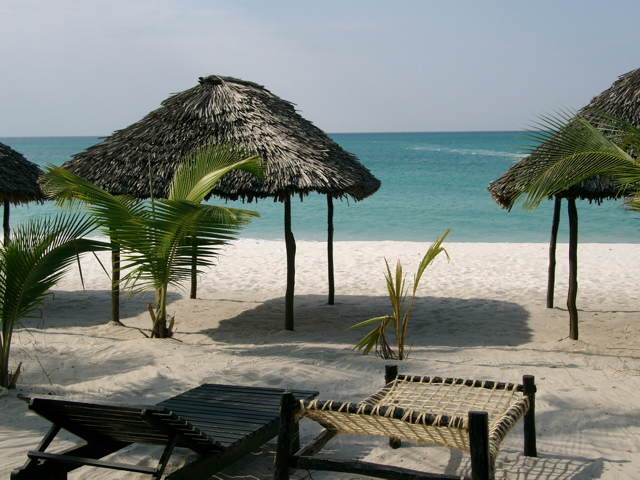
A beach in Kigamboni along the western shores of the Indian Ocean.

== Notable people from Kigamboni ==
- Aboud Jumbe Mwinyi, 2nd president of Zanzibar, became a permanent resident of Kigamboni District after retirement.
