= Kisarawe II =

Ward of the Kigamboni District in the Dar es Salaam Region of Tanzania

Kisarawe II Kata ya Kisarawe II (Swahili)
- Ward of Kigamboni District
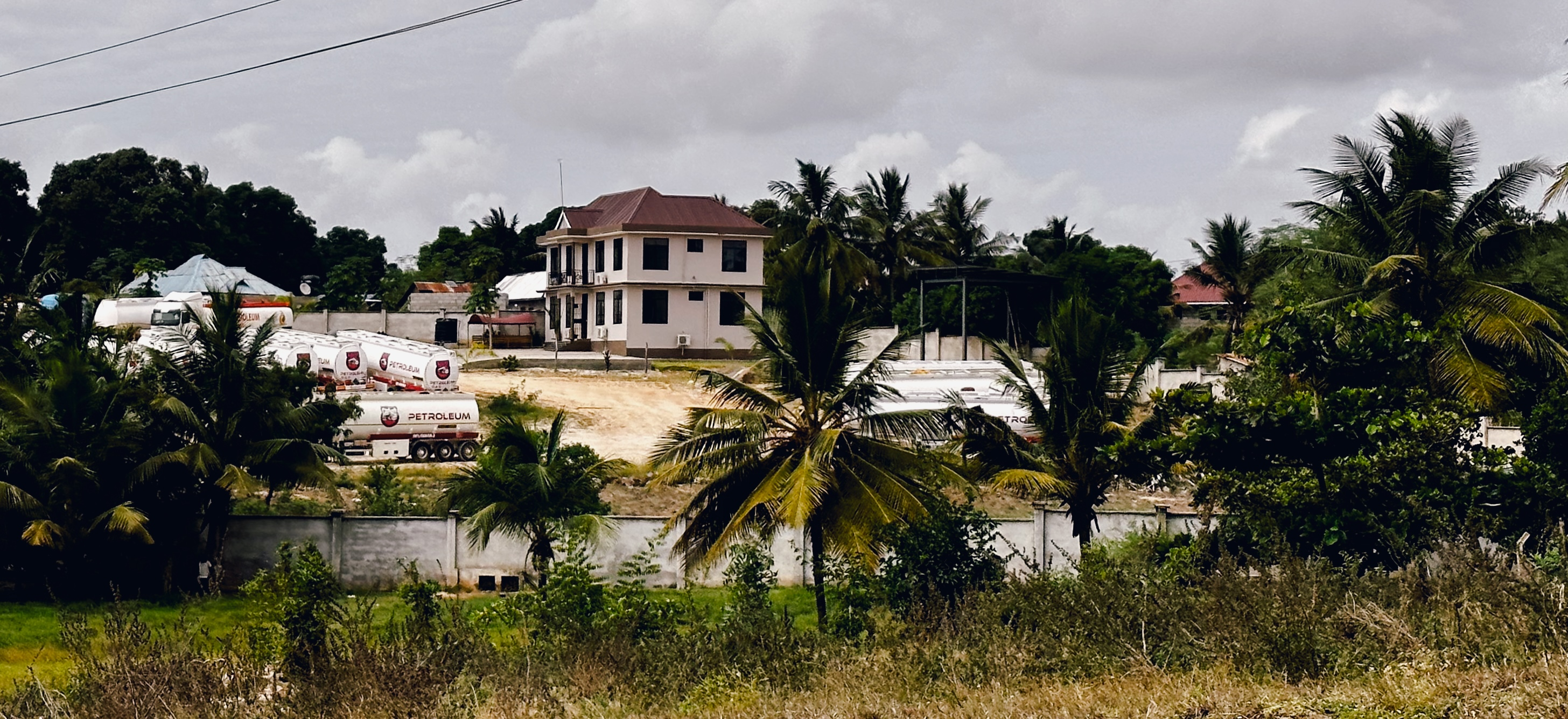
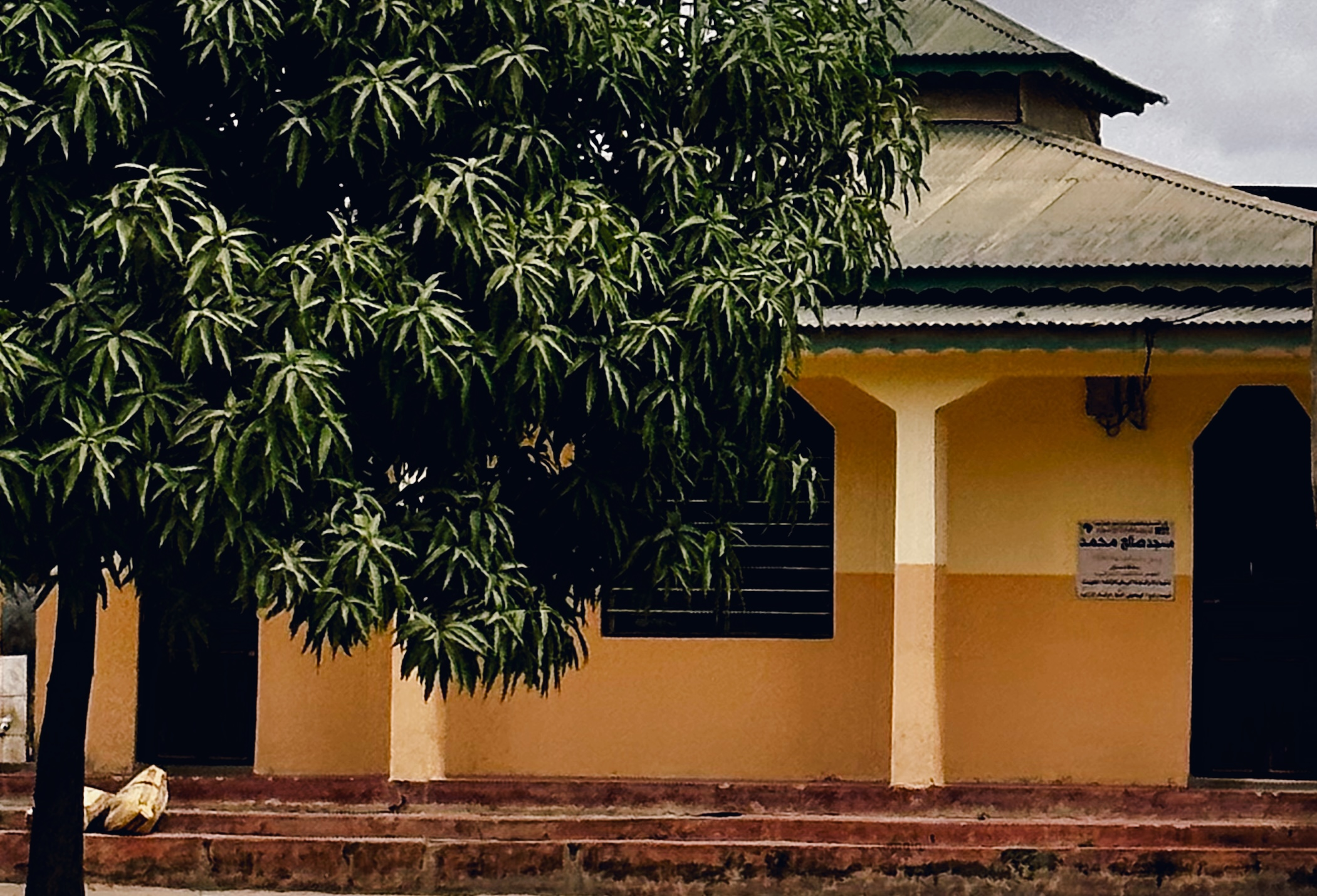
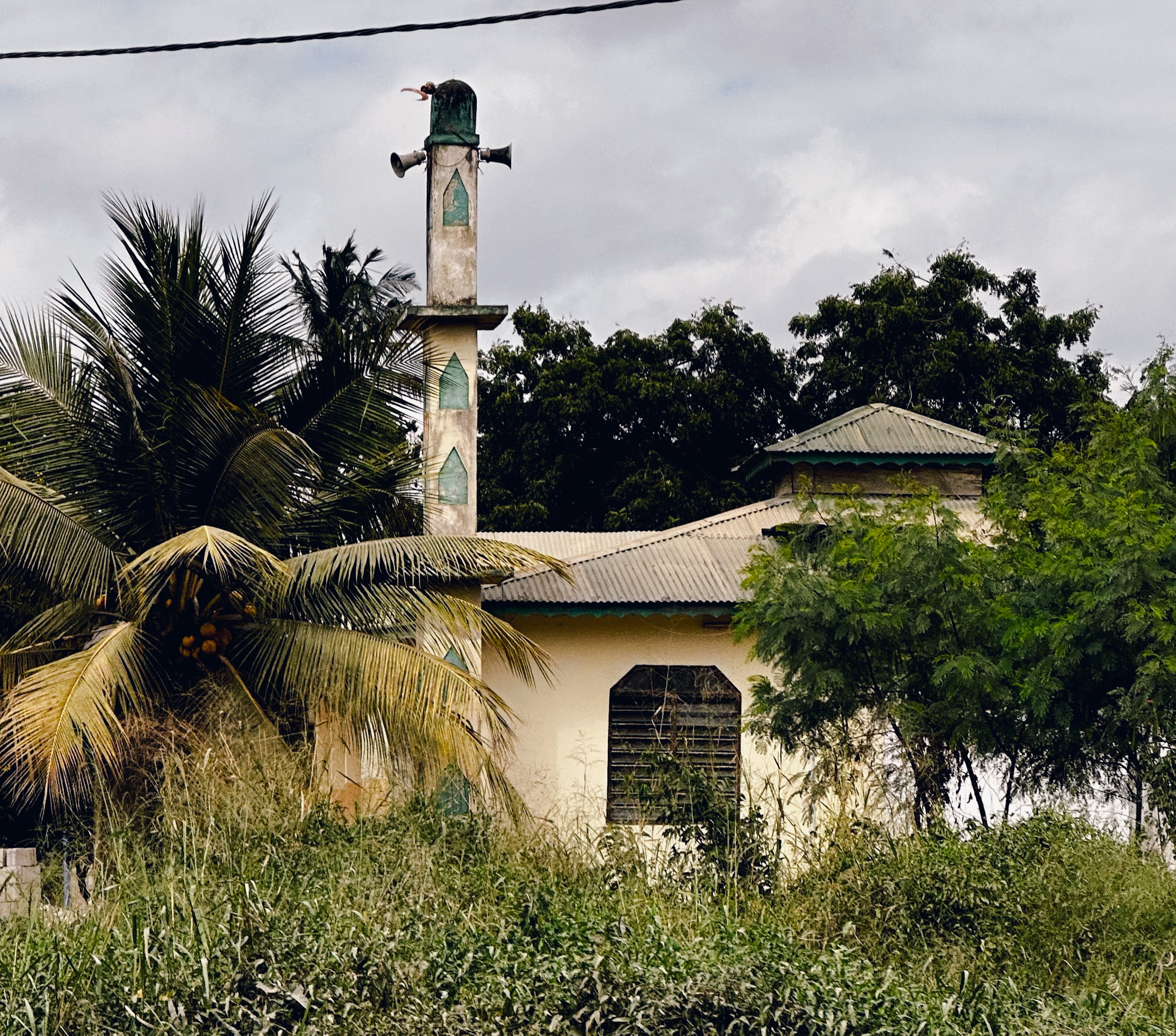
- From top to bottom: Houses in Kisarawe II ward, orange and yellow Mosque in Kisarawe II & Small mosque in Kisarawe II
- Nickname: Kigamboni's rice bowl
- Interactive map of Kisarawe II
- Coordinates: 6°56′57.84″S 39°24′28.08″E
- Country: Tanzania
- Region: Dar es Salaam Region
- District: Kigamboni District

Area
  - Total: 140 km^{2} (54 sq mi)

Population (2012)
  - Total: 8,306

Ethnic groups
  - Settler: Swahili
  - Ancestral: Zaramo
- Tanzanian Postal Code: 17104

Kisarawe II or unofficially East Kisarawe (Kata ya Kisarawe, in Swahili) is an administrative ward in the Kigamboni district of the Dar es Salaam Region of Tanzania. The Kibada and Mjimwema form the ward's northern border. East is Somangila. Pembamnazi borders it to the south. Toangoma in the Temeke District, as well as Vianzi and Vikindu in the Pwani Region's Mkuranga District, border the west. Since Kisarawe II is the district's top agricultural producer, it is known as Kigamboni's "ricebowl" and "food basket". In 2016 the Tanzania National Bureau of Statistics report there were 10,401 people in the ward, from 8,306 in 2012.

== Administration ==
The postal code for Kibada Ward is 17104. The ward is divided into the following neighborhoods (Mitaa)/Villages (Vitongoji):

- Kichangani, Kisarawe II
- Kigogo, Kisarawe II
- Lingato
- Madege
- Mkamba
- Mwaninga

- Mwasonga
- Ngoma Mapinduzi
- Sharifu
- Tumaini
- Vumilia Ukooni

=== Government ===
The ward, like every other ward in the country, has local government offices based on the population served.The Kisarawe II Ward administration building houses a court as per the Ward Tribunal Act of 1988, including other vital departments for the administration the ward. The ward has the following administration offices:

- Kisarawe II Ward Police Station
- Kisarawe II Ward Government Office (Afisa Mtendaji)
- Kisarawe II Ward Tribunal (Baraza La Kata) is a Department inside Ward Government Office

In the local government system of Tanzania, the ward is the smallest democratic unit. Each ward is composed of a committee of eight elected council members which include a chairperson, one salaried officer (with no voting rights), and an executive officer. One-third of seats are reserved for women councillors.

== Demographics ==
Like much of the district, the ward is the ancestral home of the Zaramo people. The ward evolved into a cosmopolitan ward as the city progressed over time. 8,306 people lived in the ward as a whole in 2012.

== Education and health ==
=== Education ===
The ward is home to these educational institutions:

- Chekeni Mwasonga Primary School
- Ihsan Islamic Secondary School
- Tundwi Songani Primary School
- Mkamba Primary School
- Omaya Primary School
- Vumilia Ukooni Primary School
- Kichangani Primary School
- Kisarawe II Secondary School
- Kigogo Primary School, Kisarawe II

=== Healthcare ===
The ward is home to the following health institutions:

- Chekeni Mwasonga Health Center
- Mkamba Health Center
