= Kigamboni, Kigamboni District =

Ward of the Kigamboni District in the Dar es Salaam Region of Tanzania

Kigamboni Kata ya Kigamboni (Swahili)
- Ward of Kigamboni District
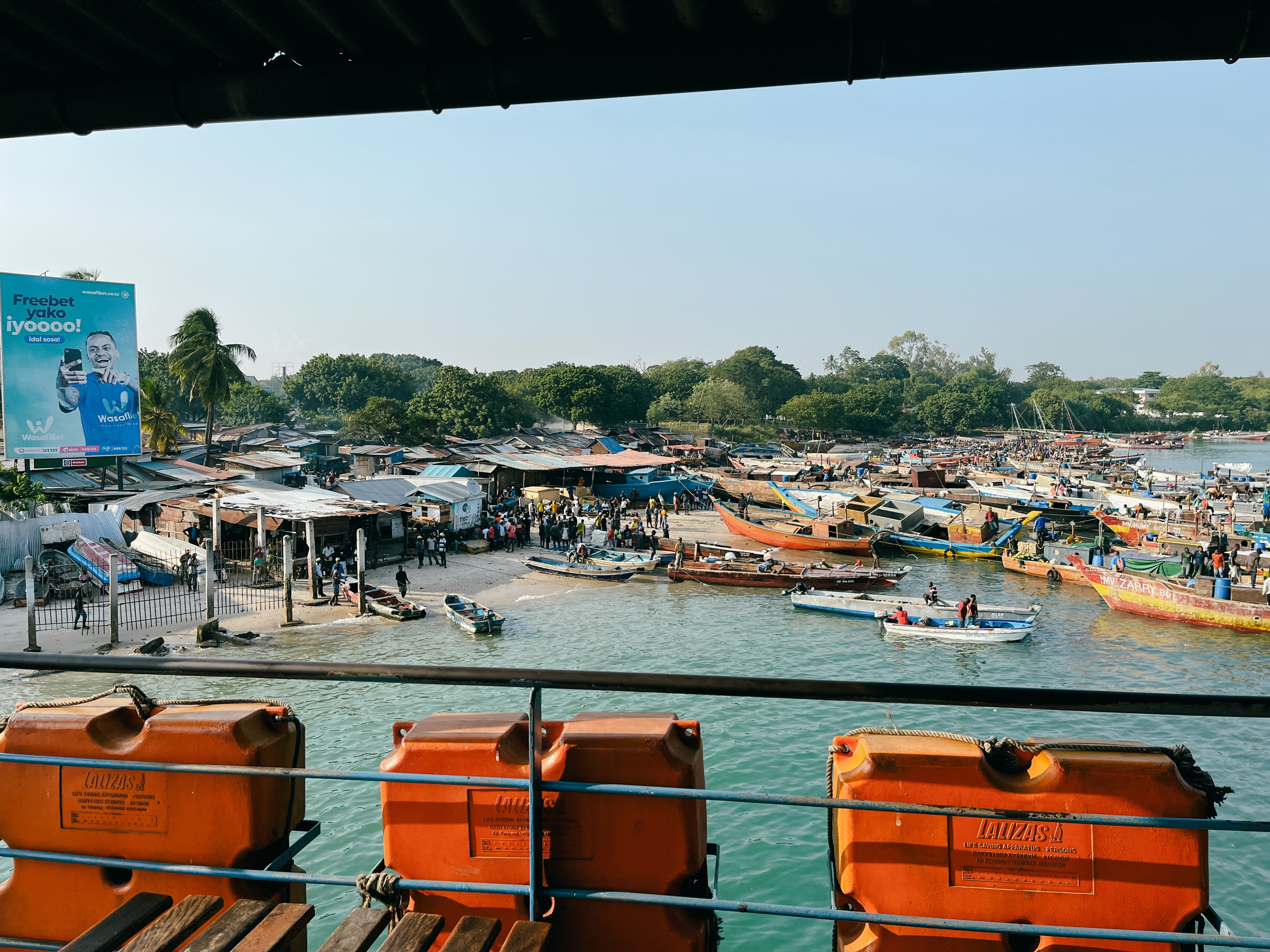
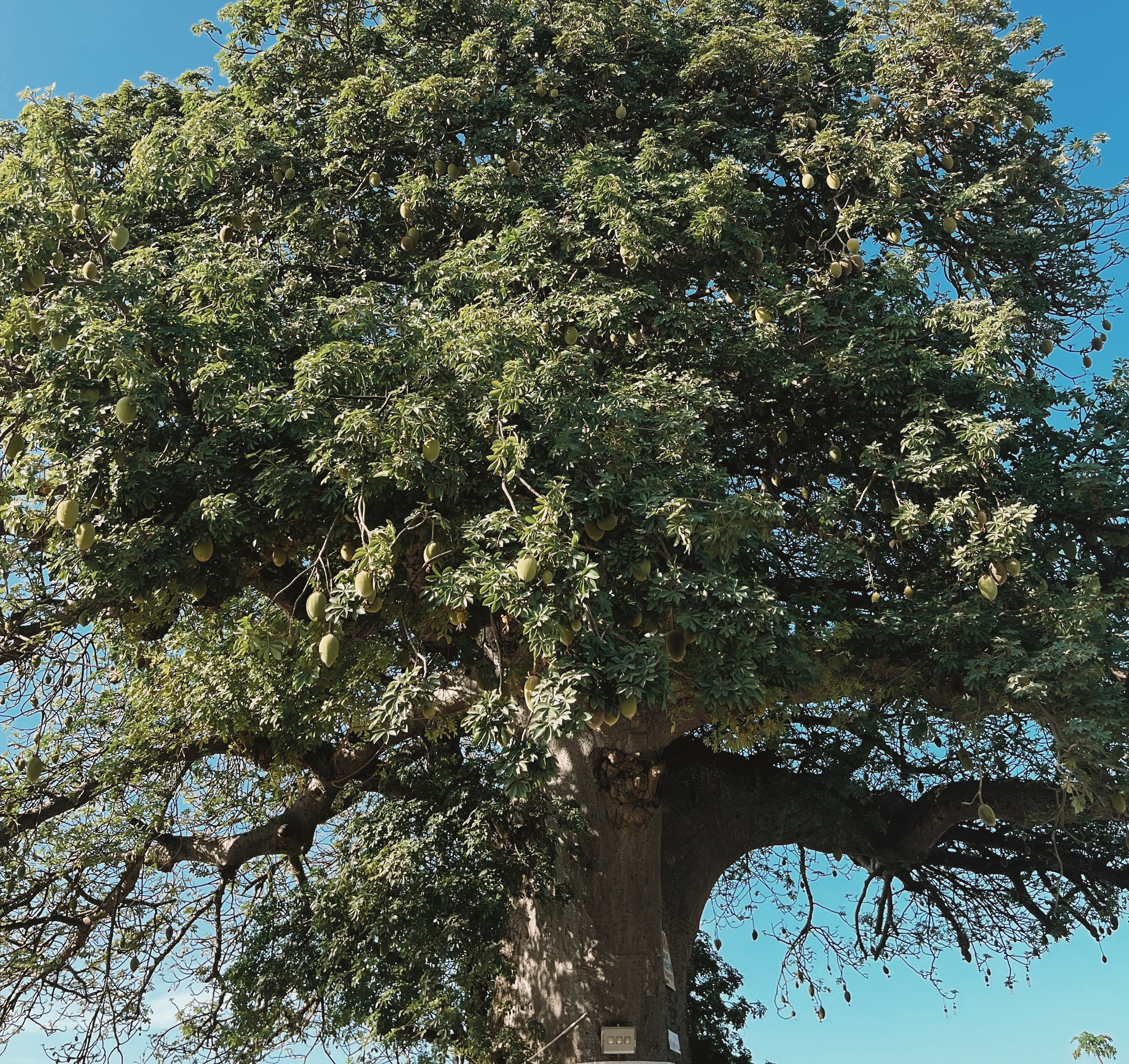
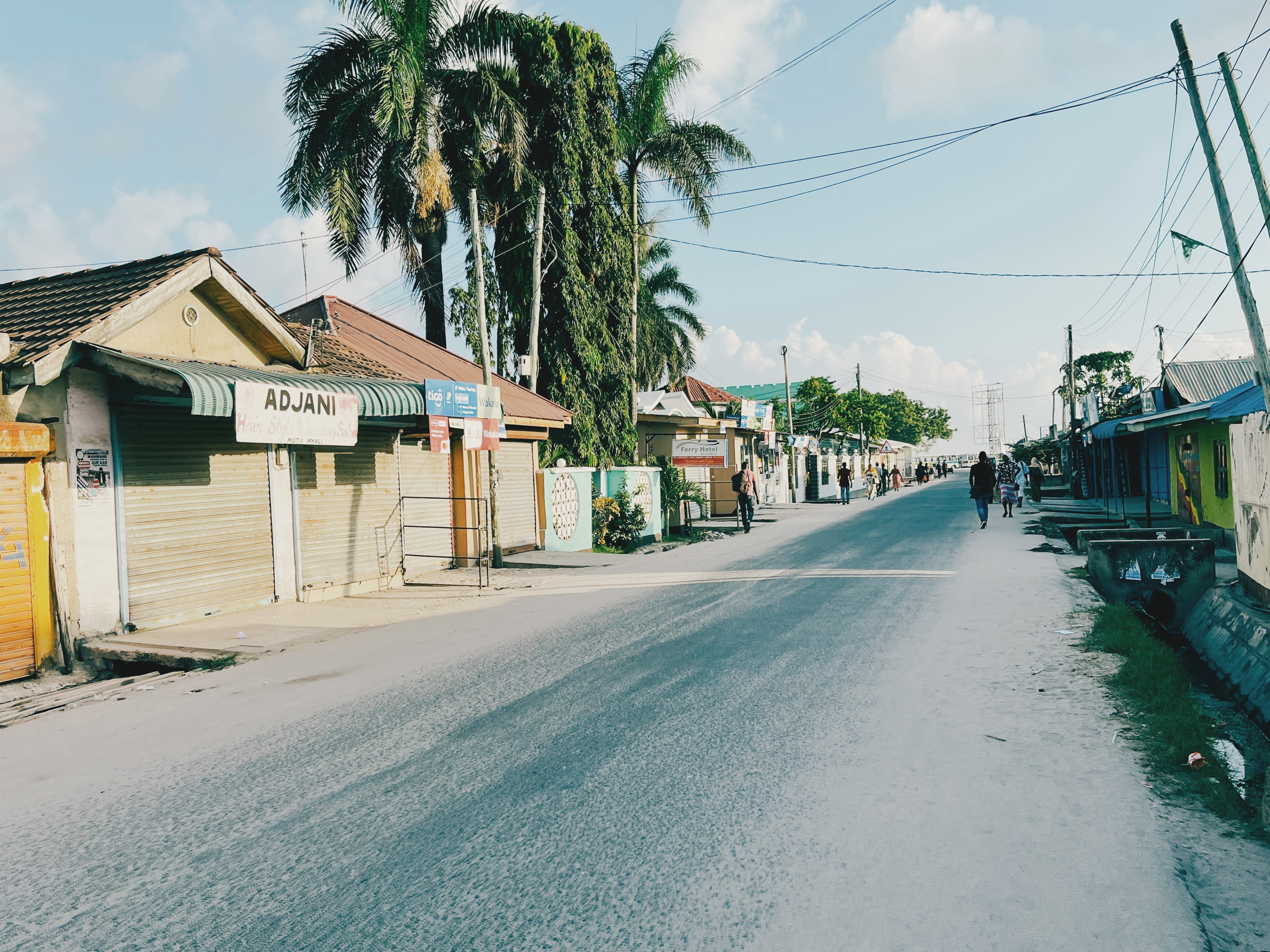
- From top to bottom: Ferry entering Kigamboni ward, Great baobab of Kigamboni market, Street scene in Kigamboni ward
- Interactive map of Kigamboni
- Coordinates: 6°49′21.72″S 39°18′8.64″E
- Country: Tanzania
- Region: Dar es Salaam Region
- District: Kigamboni District

Area
  - Total: 4.8 km^{2} (1.9 sq mi)

Population (2012)
  - Total: 30,496

Ethnic groups
  - Settler: Swahili
  - Ancestral: Zaramo
- Tanzanian Postal Code: 17107

Kigamboni (Kata ya Kigamboni, in Swahili) is an administrative ward of Kigamboni District in the Dar es Salaam Region of Tanzania. The Indian Ocean borders the ward to the east, Tungi borders it to the south, and Dar es Salaam harbor borders it to the west. The Kivukoni Ward in Ilala District, which is across the harbor mouth, borders the ward to the north. According to the 2012 census, the ward has a total population of 30,496.

== Administration ==
The postal code for Kigamboni Ward is 17107. The ward is divided into the following neighborhoods (Mitaa)/ Villages (Vitongoji):

- Ferry
- Kigamboni, Kigamboni

- Tuamoyo

=== Government ===
The ward, like every other ward in the country, has local government offices based on the population served.The Kigamboni Ward administration building houses a court as per the Ward Tribunal Act of 1988, including other vital departments for the administration the ward. The ward has the following administration offices:

- Kigamboni Ward Police Station
- Kigamboni Ward Government Office (Afisa Mtendaji)
- Kigamboni Ward Tribunal (Baraza La Kata) is a Department inside Ward Government Office

In the local government system of Tanzania, the ward is the smallest democratic unit. Each ward is composed of a committee of eight elected council members which include a chairperson, one salaried officer (with no voting rights), and an executive officer. One-third of seats are reserved for women councillors.

== Demographics ==
Like much of the district, the ward is the ancestral home of the Zaramo people. The ward evolved into a cosmopolitan ward as the city progressed over time. 30,496 people lived in the ward as a whole in 2012.

== Education and health ==
=== Education ===
The ward is home to these educational institutions:

- Kigamboni Primary School
- Ocean View Primary School
- Kigamboni Kibugumo Secondary School
- Guardian Angels Schools

=== Healthcare ===
The ward is home to the following health institutions:

- Kigamboni Hospital
- Qualitas Specialized Polyclinic, Kigamboni
- DSK Health Center, Kigamboni
- Navy Kigamboni Health Center
- Consolata Sister Dispensary, Kigamboni
- Mkamba Dispensary, Kigamboni
- Taric Dispensary, Kigamboni
