= Mpiji River =

River in Pwani Region and Dar es Salaam Region, Tanzania

- Native name: Mto Mpiji (Swahili)

Location
- Country: Tanzania
- Region: Dar es Salaam Region & Pwani Region
- District: Kisarawe, Kibaha, Kibaha TC, Ubungo, Kinondoni, & Bagamoyo
- Ward: Kwembe, Masaki, Bokomnemela, Kiluvya, Kisarawe, Tumbi, Maili Moja, Kibamba, Mbezi, Pangani, Mabwepande, Kerege, Bunju & Mbweni

Physical characteristics
- Source
  - location: Masaki, Kisarawe District, Pwani
  - coordinates: 7°3′51″S 38°59′03″E
- Mouth: Zanzibar Channel
  - location: Mbweni
  - coordinates: 6°33′36″S 39°07′09″E

Mpiji River (Mto Mpiji in Swahili) is located in the north east of Pwani Region and western Dar es Salaam Region of Tanzania. It begins in Masaki ward in Kisarawe District and eventually drains into Zanzibar Channel at the border of Mbweni ward of Kinondoni MC of Dar es Salaam and Kerege ward of Bagamoyo District of Pwani Region.

== Threats ==
In Dar es Salaam, the rivers and streams that empty into the Indian Ocean are becoming more and more filthy, according to a news report from 2021. The Mpiji and Msimbazi rivers, as well as the Mzinga and Kizinga streams, have all been contaminated by human and industrial waste. People who live nearby have destroyed natural water alignment and converted nearby streams and rivers into trash dumps. Rivers in Dar es Salaam are poorly protected, and human activity is disrupting their natural alignments.
