= Mbezi Juu =

Ward of Kinondoni District, Dar es Salaam Region

Mbezi Juu Kata ya Mbezi Juu (Swahili)
- Ward of Kinondoni District
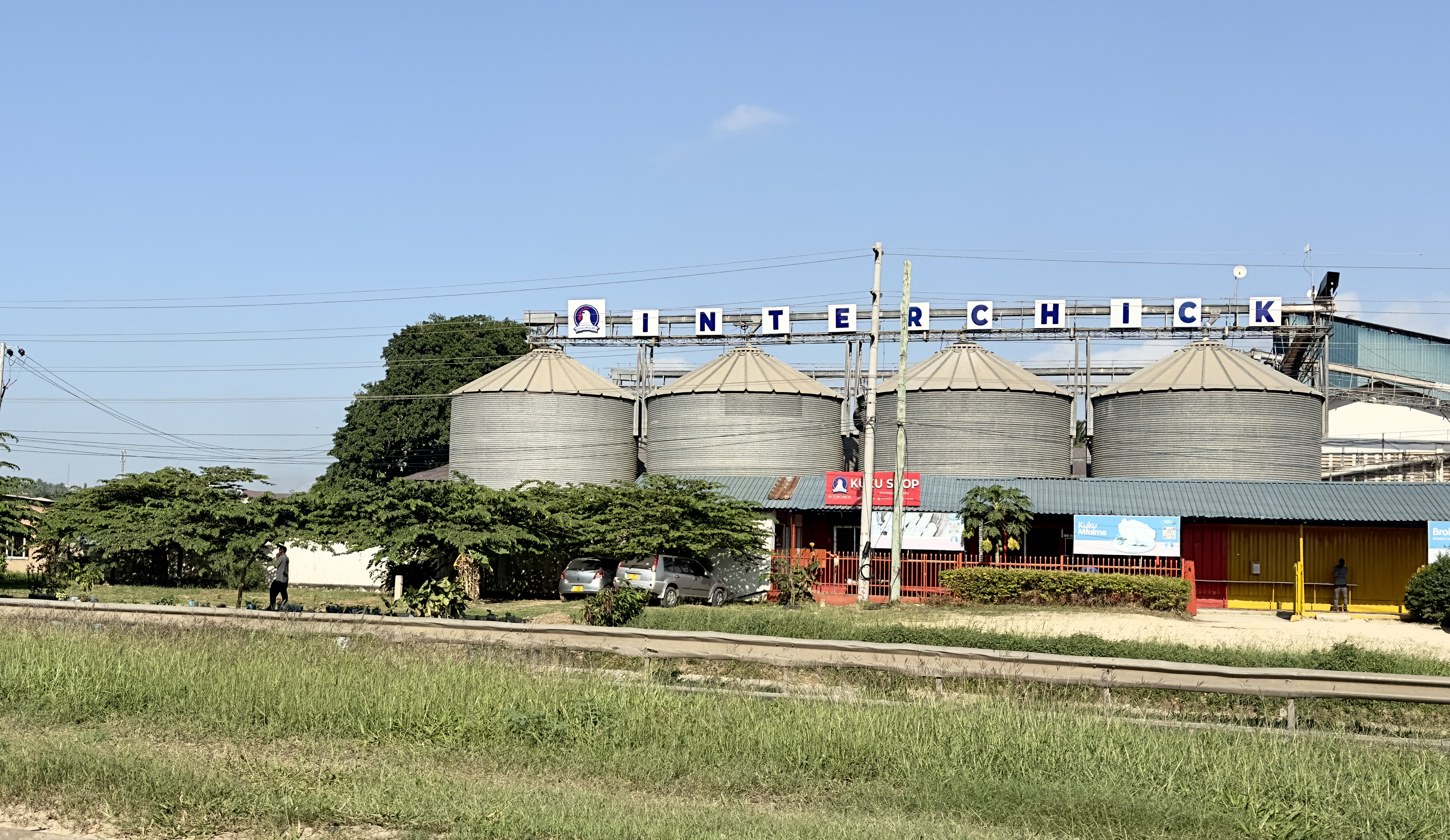
- From top to bottom: factory in Mbezi Juu
- Interactive map of Mbezi Juu
- Coordinates: 6°43′37.56″S 39°12′25.56″E
- Country: Tanzania
- Region: Dar es Salaam Region
- District: Kinondoni District

Area
  - Total: 8.8 km^{2} (3.4 sq mi)

Population (2012)
  - Total: 41,340

Ethnic groups
  - Settler: Swahili
  - Ancestral: Zaramo
- Tanzanian Postal Code: 14128

Mbezi Juu (Kata ya Mbezi Juu, in Swahili) is an administrative ward in Kinondoni District of the Dar es Salaam Region in Tanzania. The ward is surrounded by the wards of Goba of Ubungo District to the west, Makongo to the south, and Kawe to the east. Last but not least, the ward is bordered to the north by Wazo and Kunduchi wards. The ward is named after the Mbezi River, which runs through it towards Kawe. In 2012, the ward had a population of 41,340.

== Administration ==
The postal code for Mbezi Juu Ward is 14128. The ward is divided into the following neighborhoods (Mitaa):

- Jogoo
- Mbezi Juu
- Mbezi Kati
- Ndumbwi

=== Government ===
The ward, like every other ward in the country, has local government offices based on the population served. The Mbezi Juu Ward administration building houses a court as per the Ward Tribunal Act of 1988, including other vital departments for the administration the ward. The ward has the following administration offices:

- Mbezi Juu Ward Police Station
- Mbezi Juu Ward Government Office (Afisa Mtendaji)
- Mbezi Juu Ward Tribunal (Baraza La Kata) is a Department inside Ward Government Office

In the local government system of Tanzania, the ward is the smallest democratic unit. Each ward is composed of a committee of eight elected council members which include a chairperson, one salaried officer (with no voting rights), and an executive officer. One-third of seats are reserved for women councillors.

== Demographics ==
Like much of the district, the ward is the ancestral home of the Zaramo people. The ward evolved into a cosmopolitan ward as the city progressed over time.

== Education and health ==
=== Education ===
The ward is home to these educational institutions:

- Mbezi Juu Mtoni Primary School
- Ndumbwi Primary School
- Africana Secondary School
- Braeburn International School, Mbezi Juu

=== Healthcare ===
The ward is home to the following health institutions:

- Humanitarian Health Center, Mbezi Juu
- MHS-Massana Hospital and college
