= Mbezi River =

River in Dar es Salaam Region, Tanzania

- Native name: Mto Mbezi (Swahili)

Location
- Country: Tanzania
- Region: Dar es Salaam Region
- District: Ubungo & Kinondoni
- Wards: Kwembe, Msigani, Mbezi, Saranga, Goba, Makongo, Mbezi Juu & Kawe

Physical characteristics
- Source
  - location: Kwembe, Ubungo District, Dar es Salaam
  - coordinates: 6°48′27.72″S 39°4′54.48″E
- Mouth: Zanzibar Channel
  - location: Mbezi Beach, Kawe, Kinondoni District, Dar es Salaam

Mbezi River (Mto Mbezi in Swahili) is located in the Dar es Salaam Region of Tanzania. It begins in Kwembe ward in Ubungo MC and eventually drains into Zanzibar Channel at Kawe ward of Kinondoni MC. Several neighborhoods and two wards are named for the river.

== Threats ==
=== Metal contamination ===
Like all the rivers in the city, the Mbezi River has faced environmental degradation over decades. Geo-accumulation index, contamination factor, degree of contamination, modified degree of contamination, potential contamination index, and environmental toxicity quotient have all indicated that sediments from Dar's rivers are polluted, with Msimbazi and Kizinga river sediments being more polluted. This is true even though enrichment factor indicates varying contamination status of heavy metals in rivers.

Metal contamination levels for Cd, Pb, Cr, Ni, Cu, Al, Mn, Fe, and Zn were assessed using sediments from the Kizinga, Mbezi, Msimbazi, and Mzinga coastal rivers. Most of the higher concentrations of Cd, Pb, Cr, Al, Mn, Fe, and Zn were found in the Msimbazi River. While higher Ni and Cu concentrations were found in the Kizinga River, higher Mn concentrations were found in the Mbezi River. Except for Mn, Mzinga River has the lowest amounts of most metals. Mn concentrations were lowest in the Kizinga River.

=== Erosion ===
Residents of the historic hamlet living in the river plain near the outlet in the informal settlement of Ukwamani. The area was declared a flood danger zone by the government, and habitation or construction was outlawed there. The authorities began relocating the citizens; owners were given compensation, but the majority rejected the transfer. This region's river serves as a garbage disposal site, agriculture, and backyard. The most abrupt event among river behaviors, unexpected floods frequently affect the residents of Ukwamani.

=== Quarry mining ===
The middle and lower reaches of the river are home to seasonal sand miners. Sand is removed from the dried riverbed and sold as the primary ingredient in brickmaking. Although mining is a lucrative river-related industry, it has been made illegal to safeguard the banks. The practice's outlawry resulted in the establishment of criminal enterprises that now run the industry.
