= Makongo, Kinondoni =

Ward of Kinondoni district, Dar es Salaam region

Makongo Kata ya Makongo (Swahili)
- Ward of Kinondoni District
- From top to bottom: Building in Makongo ward
- Interactive map of Makongo
- Coordinates: 6°45′27″S 39°11′42.72″E
- Country: Tanzania
- Region: Dar es Salaam Region
- District: Kinondoni District

Area
  - Total: 18.1 km^{2} (7.0 sq mi)

Population (2012)
  - Total: 43,796

Ethnic groups
  - Settler: Swahili
  - Ancestral: Zaramo
- Tanzanian Postal Code: 14129

Makongo (Kata ya Makongo in Swahili) is an administrative ward in Kinondoni District of the Dar es Salaam Region in Tanzania. Kawe and Mikocheni wards form the ward's eastern boundary. The ward is bordered to the south by Kijitonyama, Sinza, Ubungo, and Kimara. The ward is surrounded by Saranga ward to the west. The ward is bordered to the north by the wards of Goba and Mbezi Juu. According to the 2012 census, the ward has a total population of 43,796.

== Administration ==
The postal code for Makongo Ward is 14129.

The ward is divided into the following neighborhoods (Mitaa):

- Changanyikeni
- Makongo, Makongo
- Mbuyuni, Makongo
- Mlalakuwa

=== Government ===
The ward, like every other ward in the country, has local government offices based on the population served. The Makongo Ward administration building houses a court as per the Ward Tribunal Act of 1988, including other vital departments for the administration the ward. The ward has the following administration offices:

- Makongo Ward Police Station
- Makongo Ward Government Office (Afisa Mtendaji)
- Makongo Ward Tribunal (Baraza La Kata) is a Department inside Ward Government Office

In the local government system of Tanzania, the ward is the smallest democratic unit. Each ward is composed of a committee of eight elected council members which include a chairperson, one salaried officer (with no voting rights), and an executive officer. One-third of seats are reserved for women councillors.

== Demographics ==
Like much of the district, the ward is the ancestral home of the Zaramo people. The ward evolved into a cosmopolitan ward as the city progressed over time.

== Education and health ==
=== Education ===
The ward is home to these educational institutions:

- Changanyikeni Primary School
- Makongo Juu Secondary School
- St. Columbus School, Makongo
- Ardhi University

=== Healthcare ===
The ward is home to the following health institutions:

- Mlalakuwa Health Center
