= Kawe, Kinondoni =

Ward of Kinondoni District, Dar es Salaam Region

Kawe Kata ya Kawe (Swahili)
- Ward of Kinondoni Municipal Dar es salaam District
- Cow Way
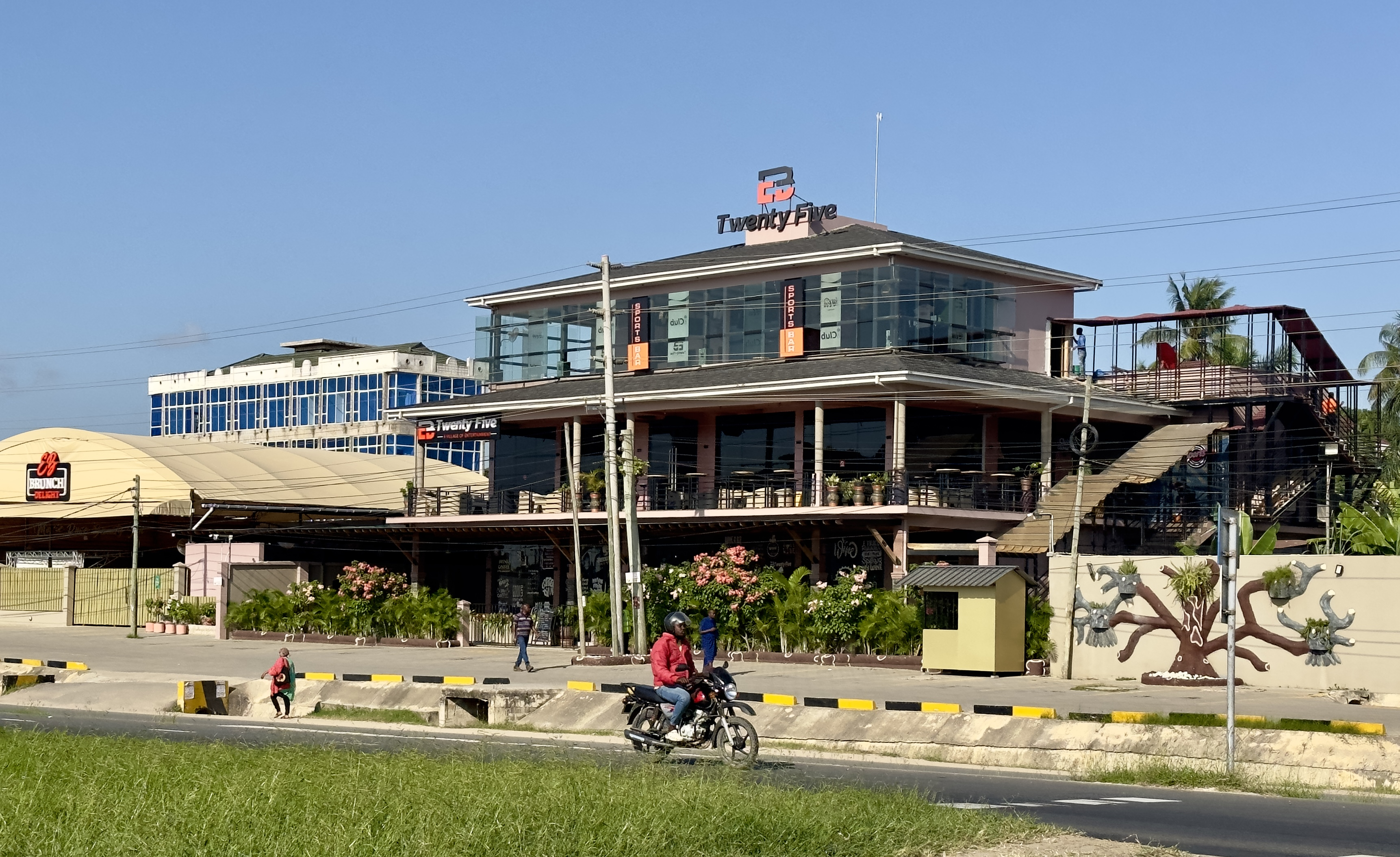
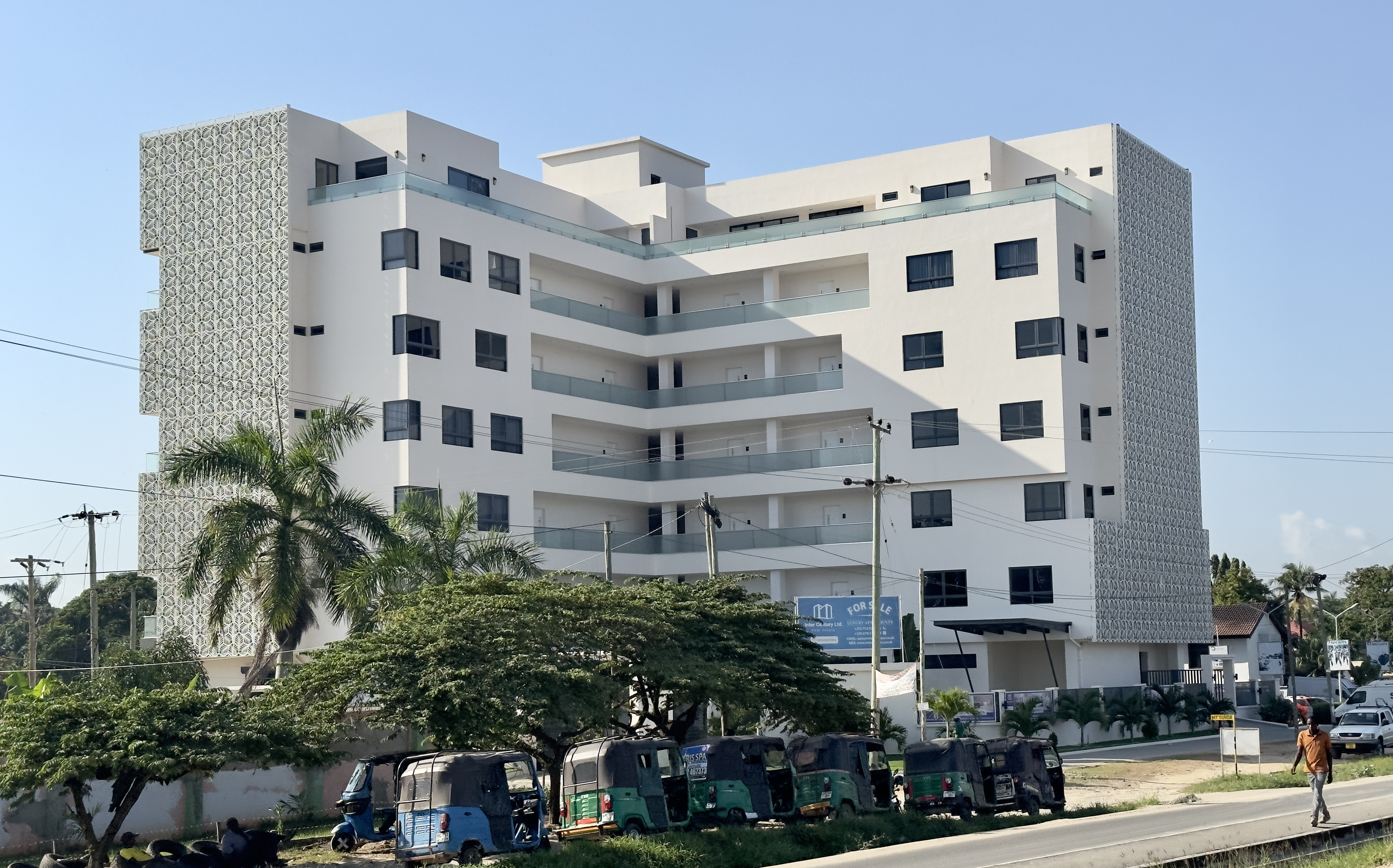
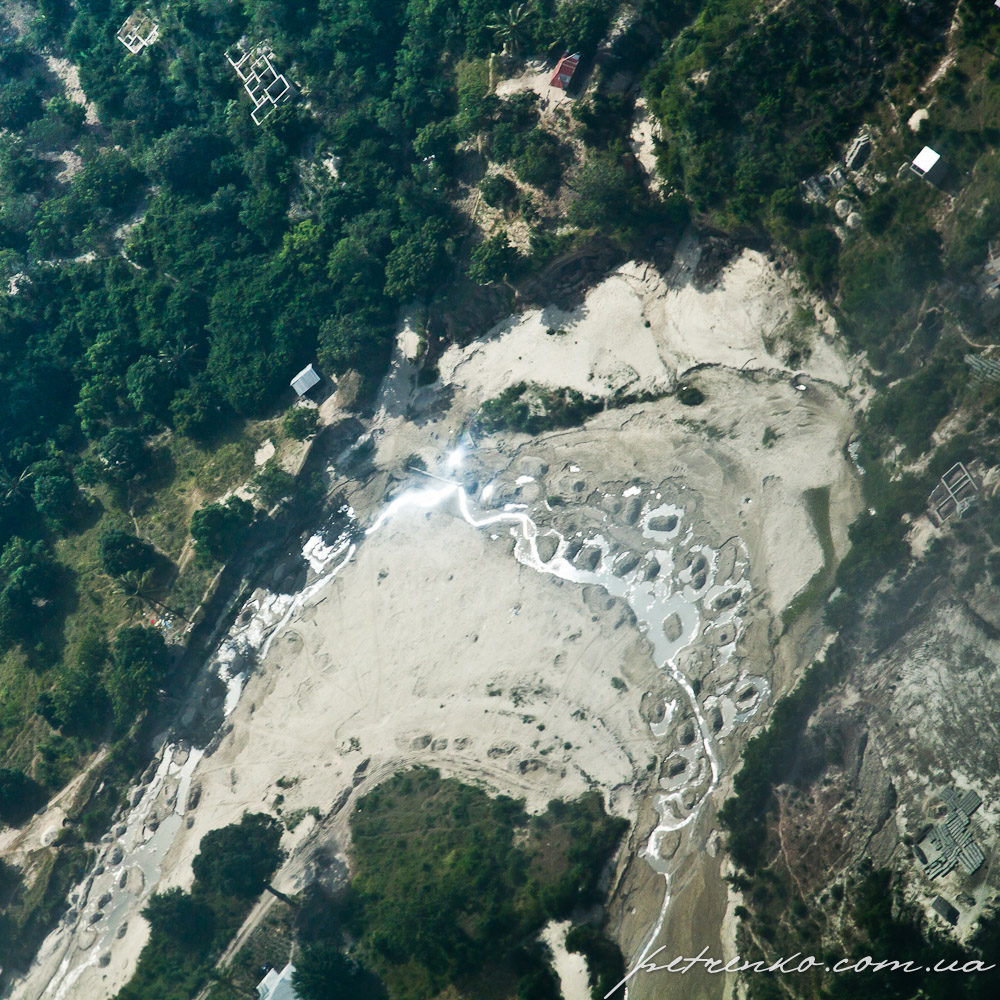
- From top to bottom: Business in Kawe, Luxury apartmaents in Mbezi Beach neighborhood of Kawe, bird's eye view of Kawe
- Nickname: Cow Way
- Interactive map of Kawe
- Coordinates: 6°43′40″S 39°13′30″E
- Country: Tanzania
- Region / City: Dar es Salaam
- District / Municipal: Kinondoni District

Area
  - Total: 15.4 km^{2} (5.9 sq mi)

Population (2024)
  - Total: 67,775

Ethnic groups
  - Settler: Swahili
  - Ancestral / Name Inventors: Zaramo, Matumbi / British Colony,
- Tanzanian Postal Code: 14121

Kawe (Kata ya Kawe, in Swahili) is an administrative ward in Kinondoni District of the Dar es Salaam Region in Tanzania.

THE ORIGIN OF THE NAME KAWE:

A HISTORICAL RECORD OF DAR ES SALAAM

Introduction

Many place names in Dar es Salaam have deep histories that were never formally written in official records, but instead preserved through oral traditions passed down from generation to generation. One such area is Kawe, whose name is directly connected to colonial-era economic activities.

Kawe before it was called Kawe

Before the area became known as Kawe, and before any permanent human settlement existed, the land was forest/bush/wildernesswith no villages or residential communities

During this period, there existed a meat processing factory known as Tanganyika Packers, which was owned and operated by the British colonial administration. The factory required a steady supply of cattle for meat processing.

The cattle route; Cattle were sourced from Makongo (Makongo Juu) and driven on foot downhill toward the factory area (present-day Kawe)

This route passed through uninhabited landserved specifically as a cattle-driving pathBecause there were no settlements along the route, the British colonial supervisor referred to it as:

“Cow Way”

(meaning: the cattle route)Transformation of the name: Cow Way → Kawe

Local cattle herders, transporters, factory workers, and residents of Makongo who participated in these activities found it difficult to pronounce the English term Cow Way gradually adapted it to local pronunciation as “Kawe”

Over time: the term Cow Way fell out of useKawe became the name of the entire areapermanent settlements began to developthe name Kawe remained official to this day

Historical significance of this account

This oral history is significant because itdemonstrates the direct link between colonial economic systems and place namesillustrates linguistic transformation from English to local speechprovides insight into Dar es Salaam before urban expansionpreserves local historical knowledge absent from written colonial records

Conclusion: According to local historical memory, the name Kawe originates from the English phrase “Cow Way”, referring to a cattle route leading to the Tanganyika Packers meat processing factory during the British colonial period. The name stands as evidence of how economic activity, language interaction, and environmental conditions collectively shaped the identities of neighborhoods in Dar es Salaam.

The north is bordered by Wazo and Kunduchi. The Indian Ocean borders the ward on its eastern side. The ward is bordered by Msasani and Mikocheni to the south. The ward is bordered to the west by the wards of Mbezi Juu and Makongo. The Mbezi River mouth is located at the Mbezi Beach neighborhood in Kawe ward. According to the 2012 census, the ward has a population of 67,115.

== Administration ==
The postal code for Kawe ward is 14121. The ward is divided into the following neighborhoods (Mitaa):

- Mbezi Beach "A"
- Mbezi Beach "B"

- Mzimuni, Kawe
- Ukwamani

=== Government ===
The ward, like every other ward in the country, has local government offices based on the population served. The Kawe Ward administration building houses a court as per the Ward Tribunal Act of 1988, including other vital departments for the administration the ward. The ward has the following administration offices:

- Kawe Police Station
- Kawe Government Office (Afisa Mtendaji)
- Kawe Tribunal (Baraza La Kata) is a Department inside Ward Government Office

In the local government system of Tanzania, the ward is the smallest democratic unit. Each ward is composed of a committee of eight elected council members which include a chairperson, one salaried officer (with no voting rights), and an executive officer. One-third of seats are reserved for women councillors.

== Demographics ==
The Zaramo and Matumbi people lived in the ward and a major portion of the district at one time. As the city progressed, the ward transformed into an international neighborhood. There are 67,775 people living in the ward.

== Education and health ==
=== Education ===
The ward is home to these educational institutions:

- Mbezi Beach Primary School
- Libermann Primary School
- Valentine Primary School, Kawe
- Foundation School
- Kawe "A" Primary school
- Kawe "B" Primary school
- Lugalo Primary School
- Ukwamani Primary School
- Feza Primary School
- Ali Hassan Mwinyi Primary school, Kawe
- Tumaini Primary School, Kawe
- Kawe Ukwamani Secondary School
- Mbezi Beach Secondary School
- Mwambao Secondary School, Kawe
- Feza Girls High School, Kawe
- Qiblatain Islamic Secondary School
- Braeburn International School, Mbezi Beach
- ESACS Secondary School
- Crown Secondary School

=== Healthcare ===
The ward is home to the following health institutions:

- Ukwamani Dispensary
- Mbezi Beach Medical Clinic
- OCC Doctors Health Center
- Tsunny Medical Center
