= Ruvu =

Ruvu may refer to:

- Ruvu River, a river in Morogoro and Pwani Regions of eastern Tanzania
- River Ruvu, a source of the Pangani River or Jipe Ruvu in northeastern Tanzania
- Ruvu, Kibaha District, a town in Tanzania
- Ruvu Ward in Same District, Tanzania
- Ruvu languages, a class of Northeast Coast Bantu languages
- Ruvu Shooting, a football club in Dar es Salaam, Tanzania
- JKT Ruvu Stars, a football club in Dodoma, Tanzania
