= Bokomnemela =

Bokomnemela Kata ya Bokomnemela (Swahili)
- Ward
- Location in Tanzania
- Coordinates: 6.833036514380857°S 38.9176210535981°E
- Country: Tanzania
- Region: Pwani Region
- District: Kibaha District

Population (2022)
  - Total: 6,871
- Time zone: UTC+3 (East Africa Time)
- Postal code: 61206

Bokomnemela is a ward in the Pwani Region of Tanzania. It is located in Kibaha District. It is bordered to the west by Soga ward, to the north by Kibaha city and to the south and east by Kisarawe District. According to the 2022 census, the population of Bokomnemela is 6,871.

== Administration ==
Soga ward is subdivided into the following villages: Mnemela Kibaoni, Mkarambati, Bokomnemela, and Mpiji.
