= Kawe =

Kawe may refer to:

- Kawe (Tanzanian ward), an administrative unit in Tanzania
- Kawe Island, in the Raja Ampat Archipelago in Indonesia
- Kawe language, the Austronesian language spoken there
