= Bunju =

Ward of Kinondoni District, Dar es Salaam Region

Bunju Kata ya Bunju (Swahili)
- Ward of Kinondoni District
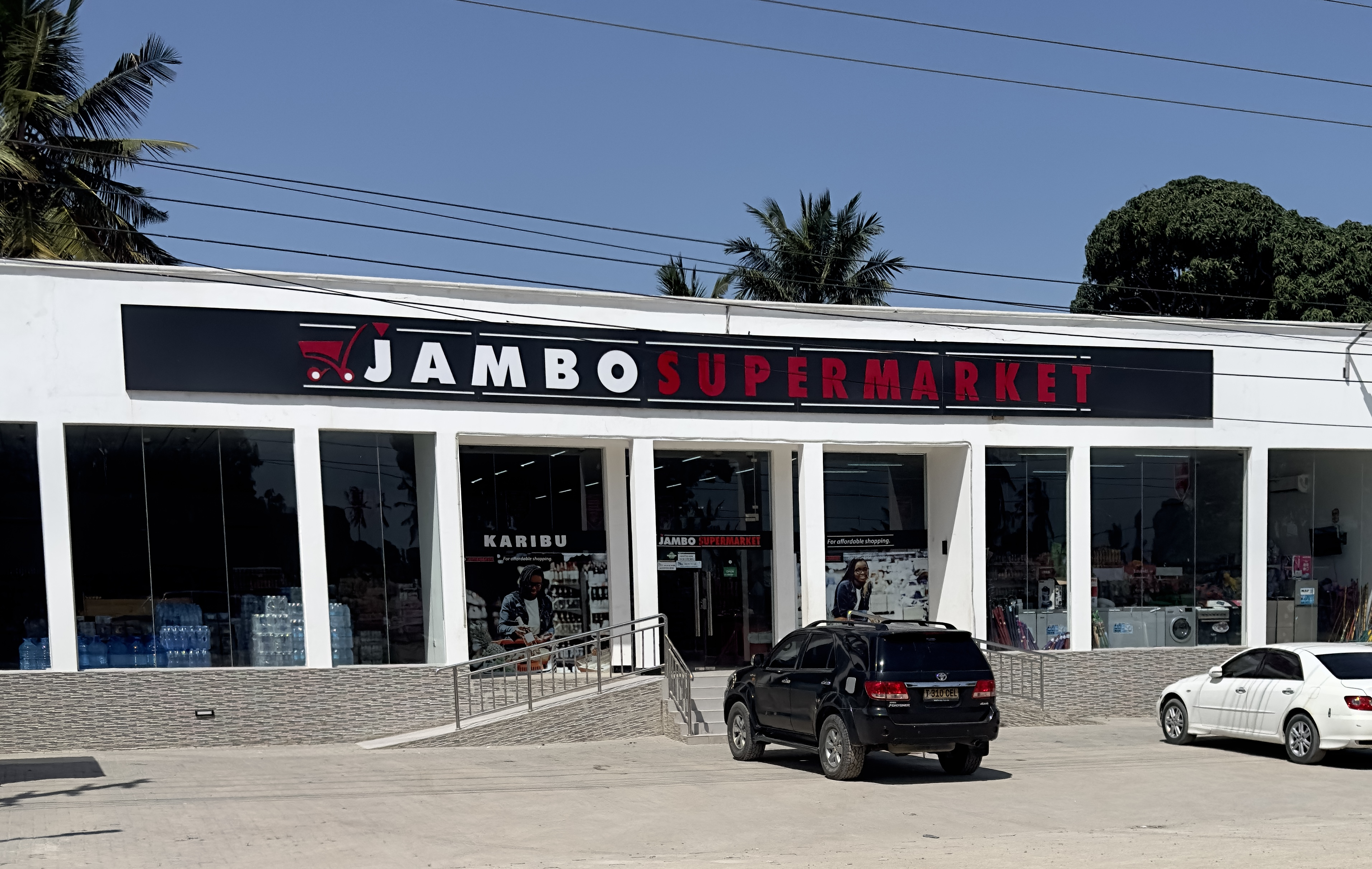
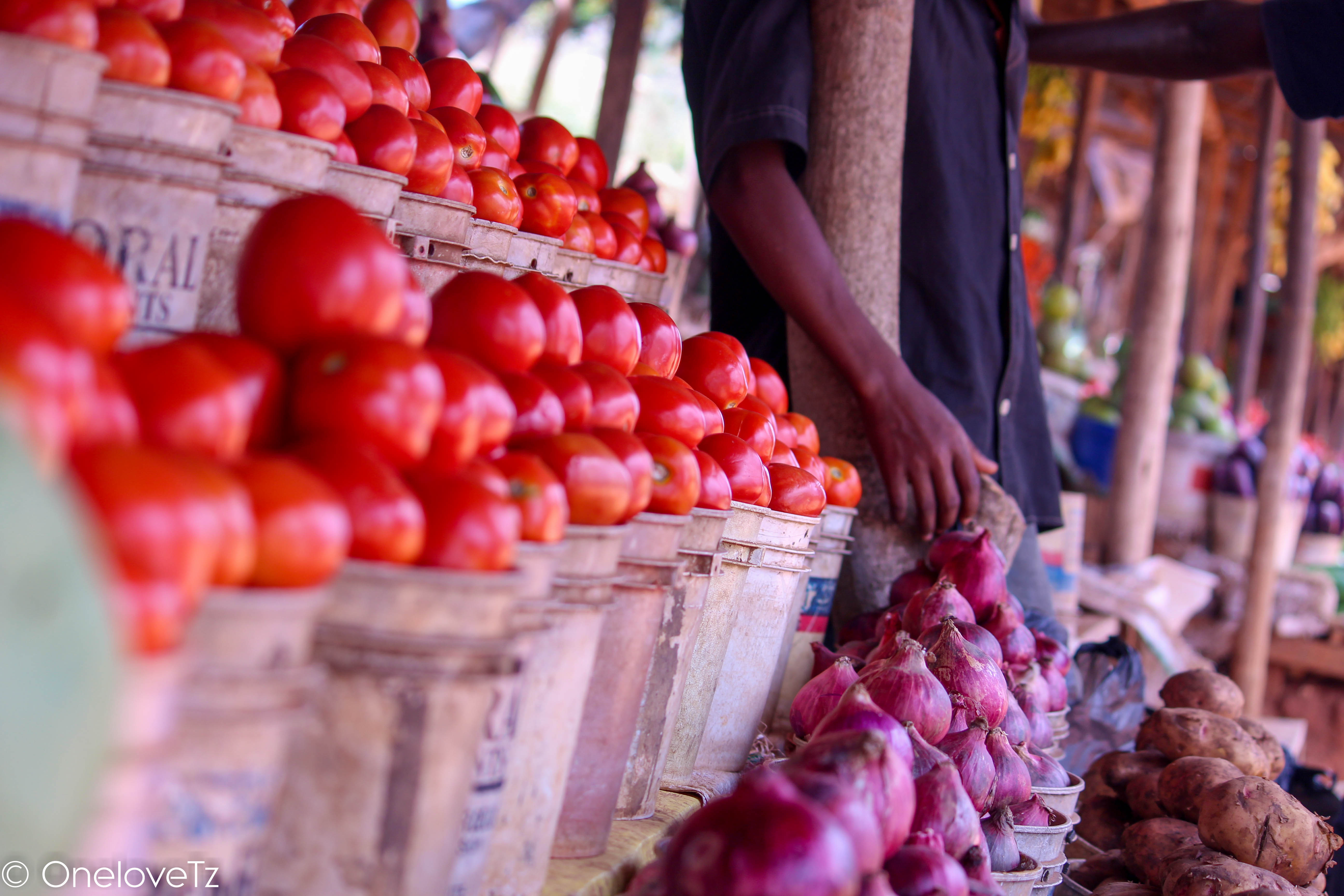
- From top to bottom: Store front in Bunju, Fresh food stall in Bunju
- Interactive map of Bunju
- Coordinates: 6°37′2.64″S 39°7′24.96″E
- Country: Tanzania
- Region: Dar es Salaam Region
- District: Kinondoni District

Area
  - Total: 34.4 km^{2} (13.3 sq mi)

Population (2012)
  - Total: 60,236

Ethnic groups
  - Settler: Swahili
  - Ancestral: Zaramo
- Tanzanian Postal Code: 14125

Bunju (Kata ya Bunju, in Swahili) is an administrative ward in Kinondoni District of the Dar es Salaam Region in Tanzania. Mbweni ward forms the ward's northern boundary. The ward is bordered by Kunduchi to the east. The ward is bordered by Wazo to the south and Mabwepande to the west. According to the 2012 census, the ward has a population of 60,236.

== Administration ==
The postal code for Bunju ward is 14125. The ward is divided into the following neighborhoods (Mitaa):

- Boko
- Bunju "A"
- Busihaya

- Dovya
- Kilungule
- Mkoani

=== Government ===
The ward, like every other ward in the country, has local government offices based on the population served. The Bunju Ward administration building houses a court as per the Ward Tribunal Act of 1988, including other vital departments for the administration the ward. The ward has the following administration offices:

- Bunju Police Station
- Bunju Government Office (Afisa Mtendaji)
- Bunju Tribunal (Baraza La Kata) is a Department inside Ward Government Office

In the local government system of Tanzania, the ward is the smallest democratic unit. Each ward is composed of a committee of eight elected council members which include a chairperson, one salaried officer (with no voting rights), and an executive officer. One-third of seats are reserved for women councillors.

== Demographics ==
The Zaramo people lived in the ward and a major portion of the district at one time. As the city progressed, the ward transformed into an international neighborhood. There are 60,236 people living in the ward.

== Education and health ==
=== Education ===
The ward is home to these educational institutions:

- Boko Primary School
- Moga Primary School
- Gosheni Primary School
- Prestige Primary School
- Mariesuvat Primary School
- Mount Everest Primary School, Bunju
- New Era Primary School
- Turkish Maarif Primary School
- Ally Happy Primary School
- Boko Secondary School
- Mianzini Secondary School, Bunju
- John the Baptist Secondary School
- Fanaka Memorial Secondary School
- Bunju Boys Secondary School
- Bunju "A" Secondary School
- Destiny Secondary School, Bunju
- Efatha Sminary Secondary School

=== Healthcare ===
The ward is home to the following health institutions:

- Elidad Hospital, Bunju
- Sinai Polyclinic, Bunju
- Heameda Medical Clinic
- Kairuki Hospital, Bunju
- Sandaruya Health Center
- Bunju Health Center
