= Soga =

Soga may refer to:

== People ==
- Soga clan, a Japanese clan of the Yamato period
- Soga clan (Sagami Province), a Japanese clan
- Soga people, of the Busoga kingdom in present-day Uganda
- Machiko Soga, Japanese voice actress
- Soga Tokimune, Japanese samurai
- Soga Sukenari, Japanese samurai

== Places ==
- Soga (river), a tributary of the Sogozha in Poshekhonye District, Yaroslavl Oblast, Russia
- Soga, Tanzania, a railway station in Tanzania
- Soga, an island in the Bissagos Islands off the coast of Guinea-Bissau
- Soga Station, a railway station in Japan

== Fictional characters ==
- Soga no Tojiko, a fictional character in the video game Ten Desires from the Touhou Project franchise

== Other ==
- Soga language, a Bantu language spoken in Uganda and the native language of the Soga people
- Soga Monogatari, a Japanese tale of the Soga brothers
- Sale of Goods Act (SOGA), legislation in the United Kingdom relating to the sale of goods
- Soga, a percussion instrument

== See also ==
- Busoga, a traditional Bantu kingdom and one of five constitutional monarchies in present-day Uganda
