= Mbweni, Kinondoni =

Ward of Kinondoni District, Dar es Salaam Region

Mbweni Kata ya Mbweni (Swahili)
- Ward of Kinondoni District
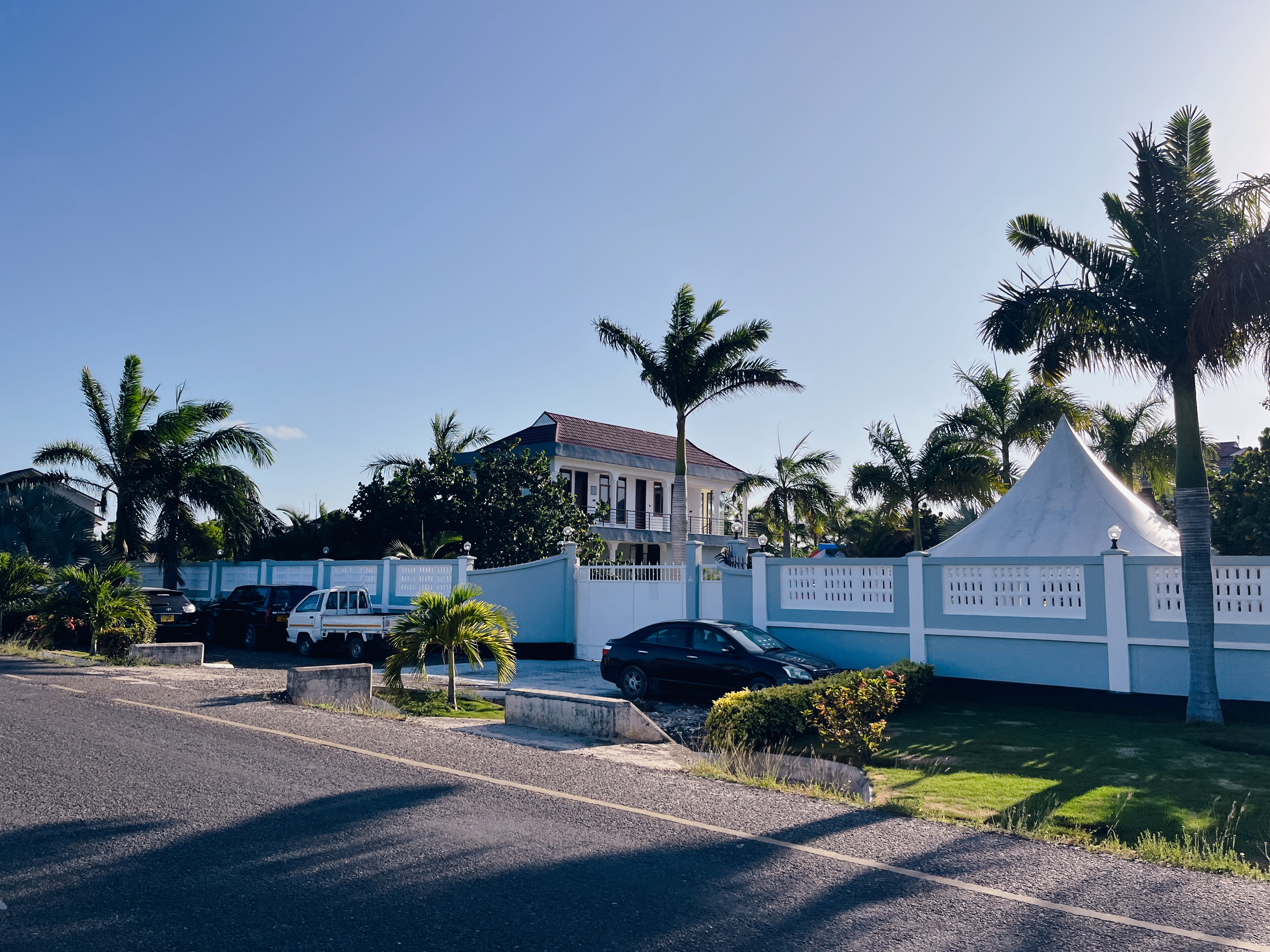
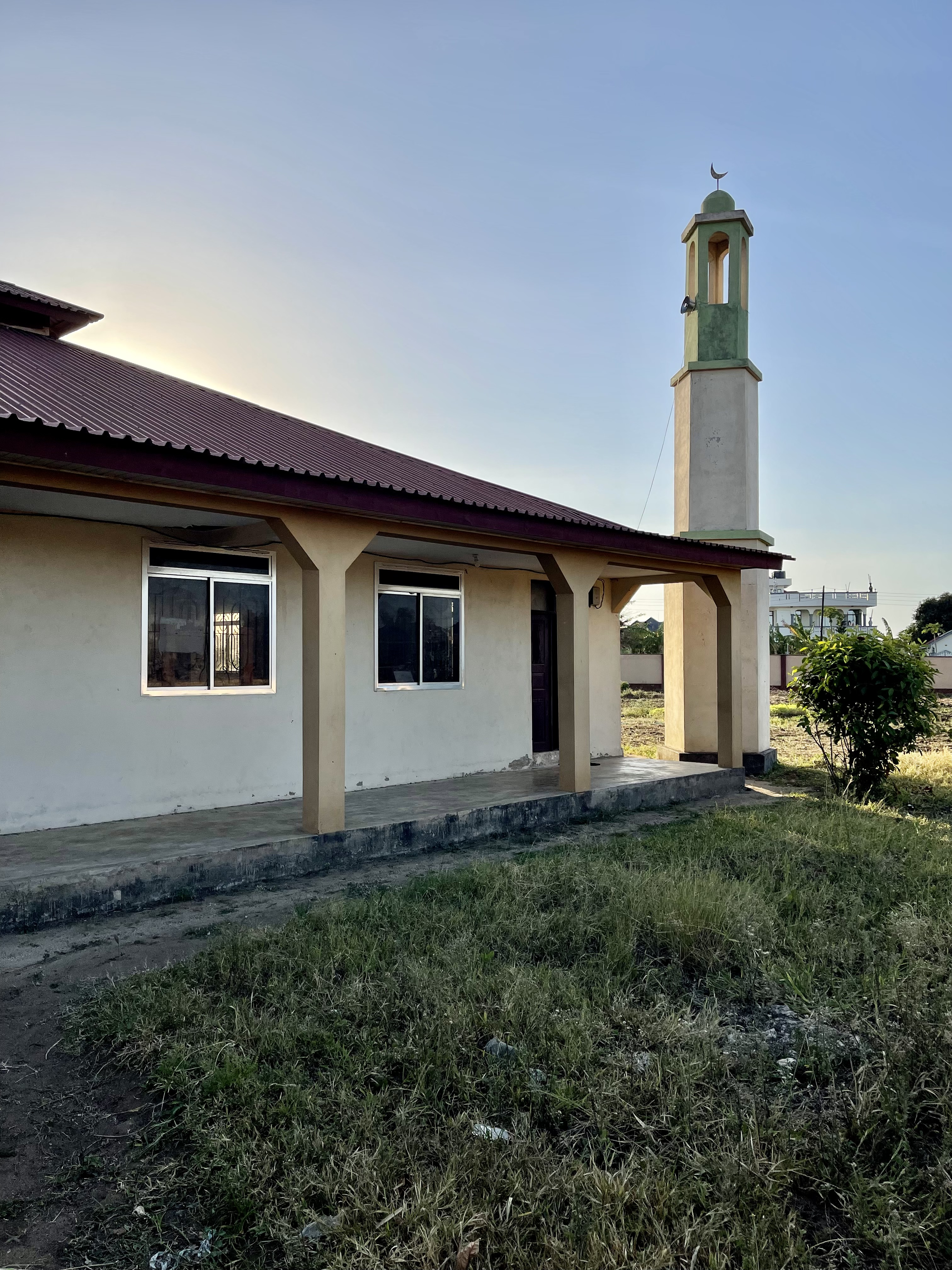
- From top to bottom: Suburban homes in Mbweni & Masjid Manaabir Ikhaii in Mbweni
- Interactive map of Mbweni
- Coordinates: 6°34′39.36″S 39°7′28.56″E
- Country: Tanzania
- Region: Dar es Salaam Region
- District: Kinondoni District

Area
  - Total: 7.5 km^{2} (2.9 sq mi)

Population (2012)
  - Total: 13,766

Ethnic groups
  - Settler: Swahili
  - Ancestral: Zaramo
- Tanzanian Postal Code: 14126

Mbweni (Kata ya Mbweni, in Swahili) is an administrative ward in Kinondoni District of the Dar es Salaam Region in Tanzania. The Indian Ocean and the Kerege ward of Bagamoyo District of Pwani Region encircle the ward's northern boundary. Kunduchi and Bunju wards form the ward's southern and western boundaries. The ward of Mbweni was once home to a Medieval Swahili settlement. According to the 2012 census, the ward has a population of 13,766.

== Administration ==
The postal code for Mbweni ward is 14126. The ward is divided into the following neighborhoods (Mitaa):

- Malindi Estate, Mbweni
- Maputo, Mbweni
- Mbweni, Mbweni

- Mpiji Mbweni
- Teta

=== Government ===
The ward, like every other ward in the country, has local government offices based on the population served. The Mbweni Ward administration building houses a court as per the Ward Tribunal Act of 1988, including other vital departments for the administration the ward. The ward has the following administration offices:

- Mbweni Ward Police Station
- Mbweni Ward Government Office (Afisa Mtendaji)
- Mbweni Ward Tribunal (Baraza La Kata) is a Department inside Ward Government Office

In the local government system of Tanzania, the ward is the smallest democratic unit. Each ward is composed of a committee of eight elected council members which include a chairperson, one salaried officer (with no voting rights), and an executive officer. One-third of seats are reserved for women councillors.

== Demographics ==
The Zaramo people lived in the ward and a major portion of the district at one time. As the city progressed, the ward transformed into an international neighborhood. There are 13,766 people living in the ward.

== Education and health ==
=== Education ===
The ward is home to these educational institutions:

- Mbweni Primary School
- Mbweni Teta Secondary School
- Dar es Salaam Independent School, Mbweni
- Hope and Joy Secondary School, Mbweni
- Maendeleo Primary School
- Mount Everest School, Mbweni
- Shamsiye Boys Secondary School, Mbweni
- Nyaishozi College of Health and Allied Sciences, Mbweni

=== Healthcare ===
The ward is home to the following health institutions:

- Mbweni Mpiji Dispensary
- Mbweni Health Center
- Mbweni JKT Health Center
- Mbweni "B" Health Center
- St. Joseph's Hospital, Mbweni
- NEHOTA Mental Health Hospital, Mbweni

== See also ==
Historic Swahili Settlements
