= Mlandizi =

Ward in Kibaha District, Pwani Region

Mlandizi Kata ya Mlandizi (Swahili)
- Ward and Town
- Mlandizi Ward
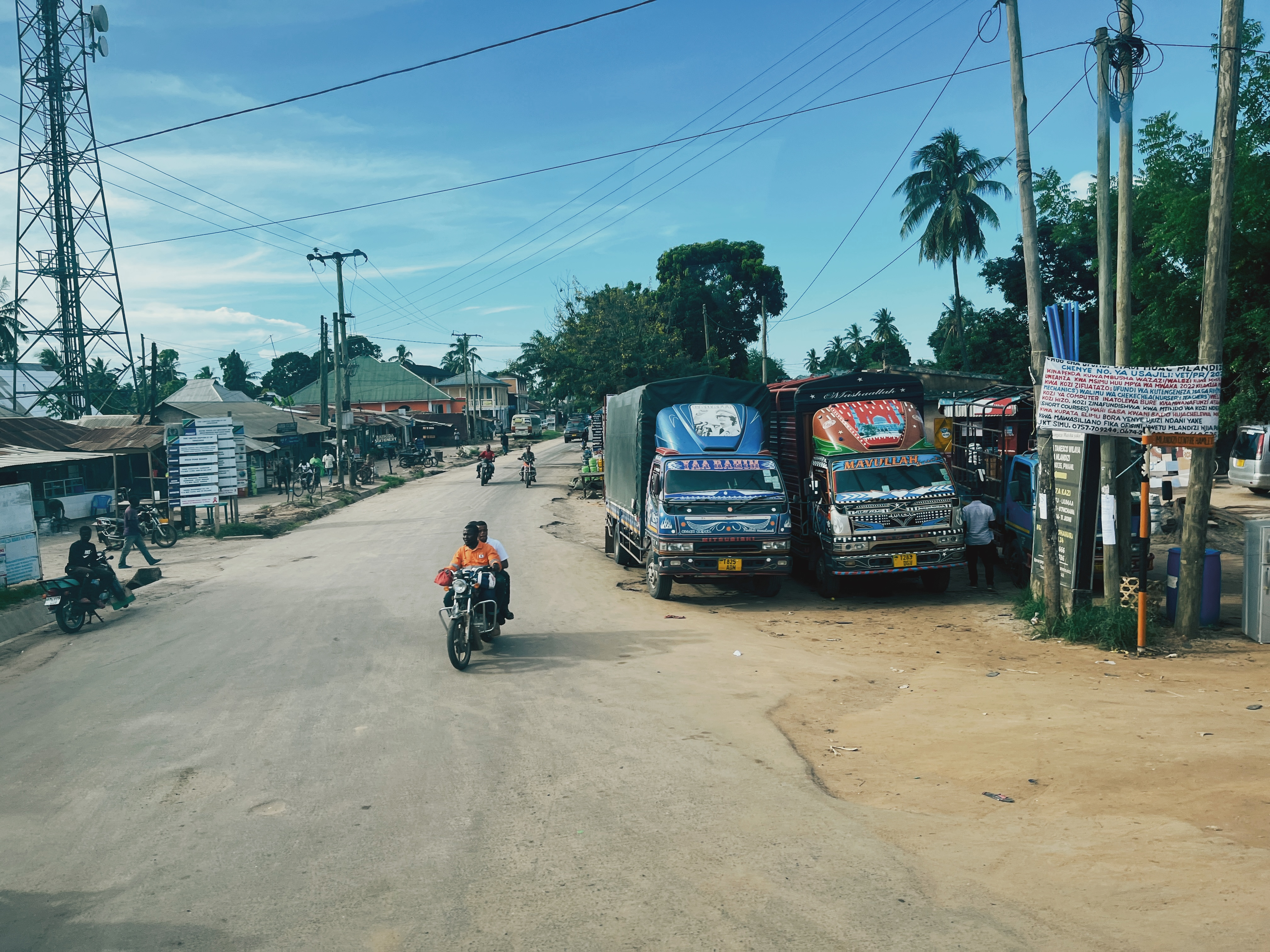
- Street in Mlandizi Ward

- Location within Tanzania
- Country: Tanzania
- Region: Pwani Region
- District: Kibaha District

Area
  - Total: 17.54 km^{2} (6.77 sq mi)
- Elevation: 60 m (200 ft)

Population (2022)
  - Total: 13,333
  - Density: 760.1/km^{2} (1,969/sq mi)

Ethnic groups
  - Settler: Swahili
  - Native: Zaramo
- Tanzanian Postal Code: 61201

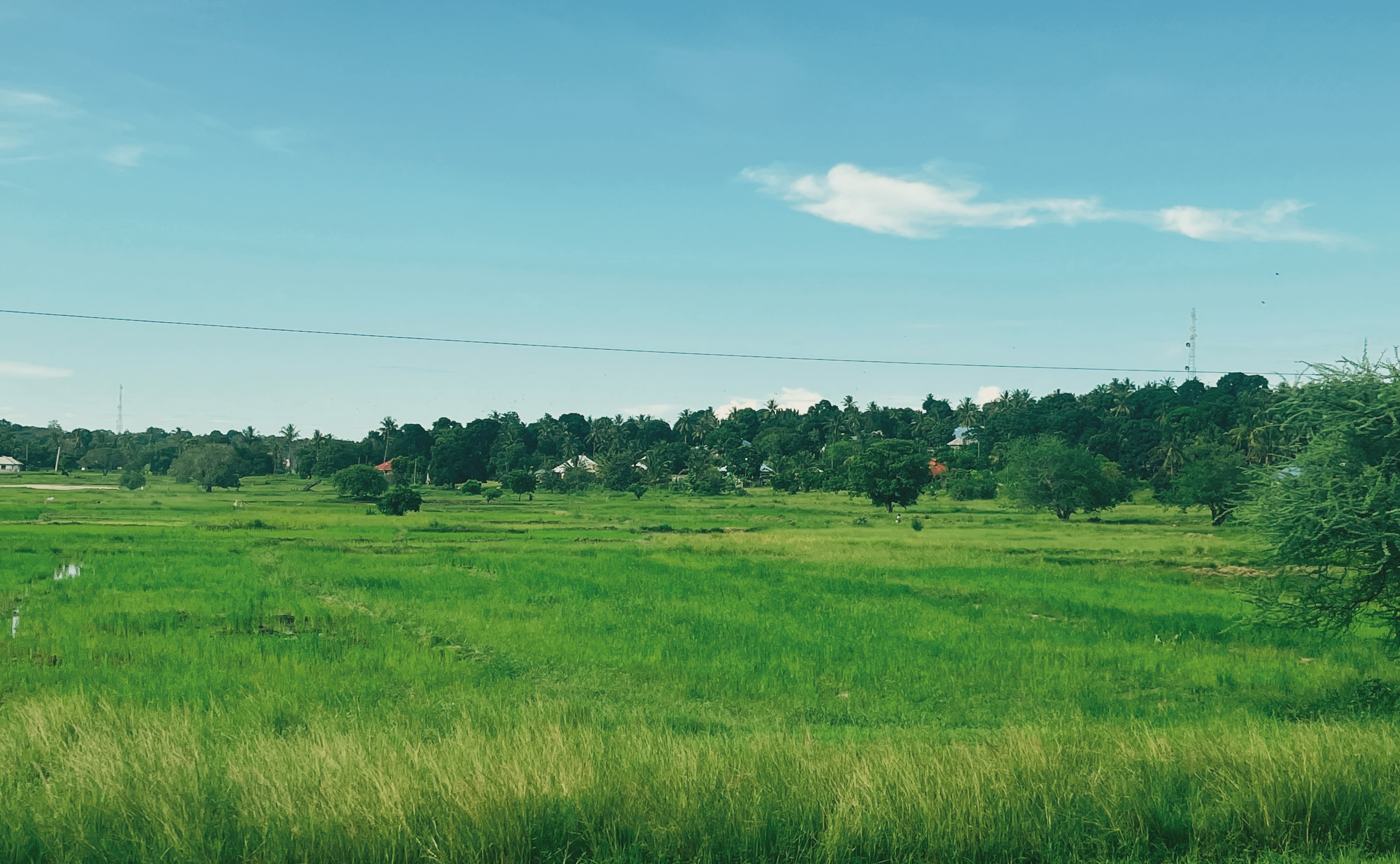
Rice fields in Mlandizi Ward, Kibaha

Mlandizi is an administrative ward and capital of Kibaha District in Pwani Region of Tanzania.

== Description ==
According to the 2022 census, the population of Mlandizi is 13,333. There are 6,255 males and 7,078 females. There are 3,986 households with an average household size of 3.3. The ward covers an area of 17.54 km^{2} (6.77 sq mi). It has 3,324 buildings in total, the most of all the wards in the district.
