= Kikongo, Tanzania =

Coordinates: 6°49′40″S 38°42′40″E

Kikongo Kata ya Kikongo (Swahili)
- Ward
- Kikongo Ward
- Interactive map of Kikongo
- Country: Tanzania
- Region: Pwani Region
- District: Kibaha District

Area
  - Total: 114.2 km^{2} (44.1 sq mi)

Population (2022)
  - Total: 6,463
  - Density: 56.59/km^{2} (146.6/sq mi)
- Time zone: UTC+3 (East Africa Time)
- Postal code: 61206

Kikongo is a ward in the Pwani Region of Tanzania. It is located in Kibaha District.

== Description ==
According to the 2022 census, the population of Kikongo is 6,463. There are 3,277 males and 3,186 females. There are 1,925 households with an average household size of 3.4. The ward covers an area of 114.2 km^{2} (44.1 sq mi). It has 1,946 buildings in total.
