= Kamba War =

Civil war in Bagamoyo

The term Kamba War has been used by historians to refer to a conflict that took place between the Kamba people and communities living in regions around present day Bagamoyo, Tanzania. It has been argued that the Kamba attack forced the communities living in this area to unite against the enemy and that this unification led to the creation of Zaramo identity. The Zaramo are presently the largest ethnic group in the regions surrounding Dar es Salaam in Tanzania.

== Overview ==
Zaramo traditions state that these Swahili communities later known as Zaramo were led by a group of Shirazi rulers called Shomvi or Shomwi at the time they were attacked by the Kamba people of Kenya. Other accounts indicate that it was these communities that were known as Shomvi. The Shomvi sought the assistance of a leader known as Pazi Kilama Lukali or Pazi Kibwe Banduka who came to their aid. Subsequently, the Shomvi agreed to offer the Pazi an annual tribute as ongoing payment for his assistance.

== Periodization ==
Fabian (2019) states that the "Zaramo played (a role) in assisting the Shomvi at the dawn of the nineteenth century when a society from the north, the Kamba, invaded the region..."

== Shomvi appeal to Pazi ==
Fabian (2019) states that according to one account;

...the Shomvi implored the leader of the more powerful and numerous Zaramo clans, Pazi Kilama Lukali, to intercede on their behalf and attack the Kamba. The Kamba also potentially threatened the Zaramo's trade interests in the hinterland by diverting routes north. Reluctant at first, Lukali was later provoked into action by his sister, while other Zaramo chiefs, most notably his nephew, who splintered from his uncle and founded the Doe people during the war, engaged the Kamba as well.

— Fabian, 2019

== Outcome ==
According to Zaramo traditions, the Kamba were routed with the assistance of Pazi Kilama and the Shomvi returned to the coast. In exchange for Lukali's assistance, they agreed to pay Lukali an annual tribute known as kanda la pazi, this was paid in the form of cloth and salt.
