= Mtongani =

Coordinates: 7°23′54″S 39°14′06″E

Mtongani Kata ya Mtongani (Swahili)
- Ward
- Mtongani Ward
- Interactive map of Mtongani
- Country: Tanzania
- Region: Pwani Region
- District: Kibaha District

Government
  - Type: Ward Council

Area
  - Total: 21.59 km^{2} (8.34 sq mi)

Population (2022)
  - Total: 13,484
  - Density: 624.5/km^{2} (1,618/sq mi)
- Time zone: UTC+3 (East Africa Time)
- Postal code: 61213

Mtongani is a ward in the Pwani Region of Tanzania. It is located in Kibaha District.

== Description ==
According to the 2022 census, the population of Mtongani is 13,484. There are 6,396 males and 7,088 females. There are 4,014 households with an average household size of 3.4. The ward covers an area of 21.59 km^{2} (8.34 sq mi). It has 2,799 buildings in total.
