= Magindu =

Coordinates: 6°48′S 38°19′E

Magindu Kata ya Magindu (Swahili)
- Ward
- Magindu Ward
- Interactive map of Magindu
- Country: Tanzania
- Region: Pwani Region
- District: Kibaha District

Government
  - Type: Ward Council

Area
  - Total: 261.9 km^{2} (101.1 sq mi)

Population (2022)
  - Total: 6,785
  - Density: 25.91/km^{2} (67.10/sq mi)
- Time zone: UTC+3 (East Africa Time)
- Postal code: 61211

Magindu is a ward in the Pwani Region of Tanzania. It is located in Kibaha District.

== Description ==
According to the 2022 census, the population of Magindu is 6,785. There are 3,326 males and 3,459 females. There are 1,788 households with an average household size of 3.8. The ward covers an area of 261.9 km^{2} (101.1 sq mi). It has 2,107 buildings in total.
