= Mtambani =

Coordinates: 6°42′54″S 38°44′18″E

Mtambani Kata ya Mtambani (Swahili)
- Ward
- Mtambani Ward
- Interactive map of Mtambani
- Country: Tanzania
- Region: Pwani Region
- District: Kibaha District

Government
  - Type: Ward Council

Area
  - Total: 40.70 km^{2} (15.71 sq mi)

Population (2022)
  - Total: 12,427
  - Density: 305.3/km^{2} (790.8/sq mi)
- Time zone: UTC+3 (East Africa Time)
- Postal code: 61212

Mtambani is a ward in the Pwani Region of Tanzania. It is located in Kibaha District.

== Description ==
According to the 2022 census, the population of Mtambani is 12,427. There are 6,530 males and 5,897 females. There are 2,860 households with an average household size of 4.3. The ward covers an area of 40.70 km^{2} (15.71 sq mi). It has 2,095 buildings in total.
