= Kawawa, Tanzania =

Coordinates: 6°46′50″S 38°45′32″E

Kawawa Kata ya Kawawa (Swahili)
- Ward
- Kawawa Ward
- Interactive map of Kawawa
- Country: Tanzania
- Region: Pwani Region
- District: Kibaha District

Area
  - Total: 13.46 sq mi (34.85 km^{2})

Population (2022)
  - Total: 5,671
- Time zone: UTC+3 (East Africa Time)
- Postal code: 61206

Kawawa is a ward in the Pwani Region of Tanzania. It is located in Kibaha District.

== Description ==
According to the 2022 census, the population of Kawawa is 5,671. There are 2,864 males and 2,807 females. There are 1,554 households with an average household size of 3.6. The ward covers an area of 34.85 km^{2} (13.46 sq mi). It has 1,961 buildings in total.
