= Kunduchi =

Ward of Kinondoni District, Dar es Salaam Region

Kunduchi Kata ya Kunduchi (Swahili)
- Ward of Kinondoni District
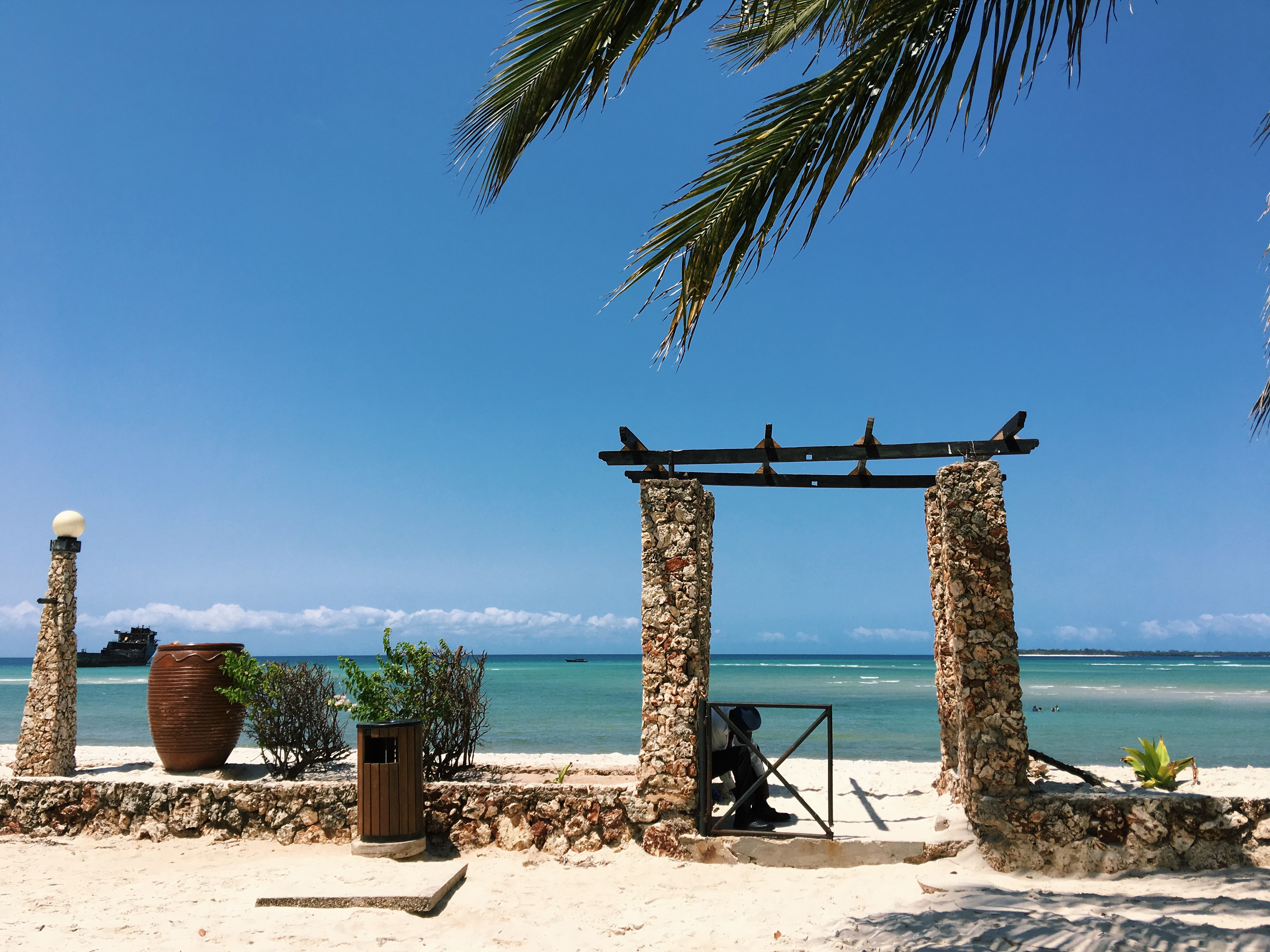
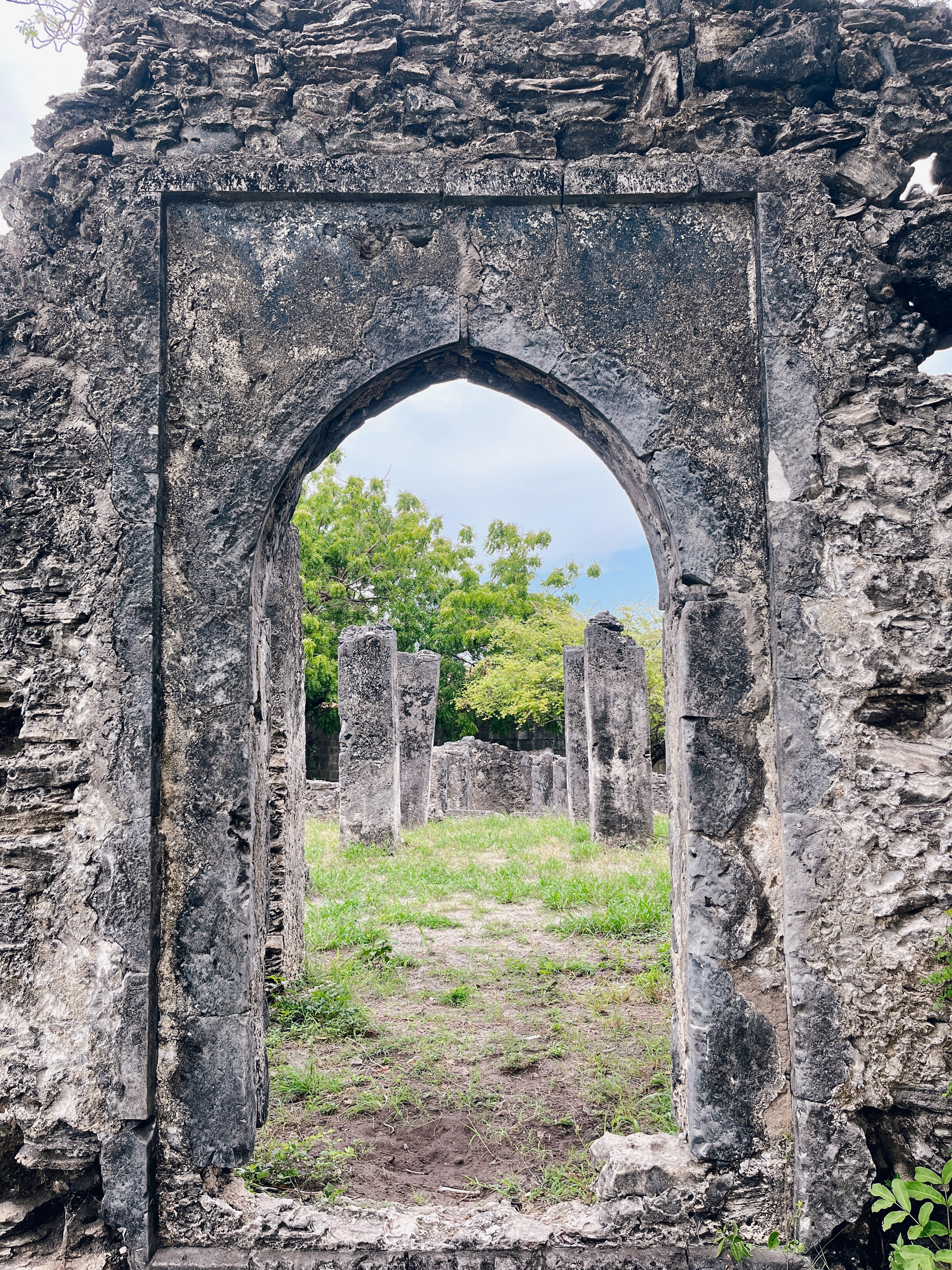
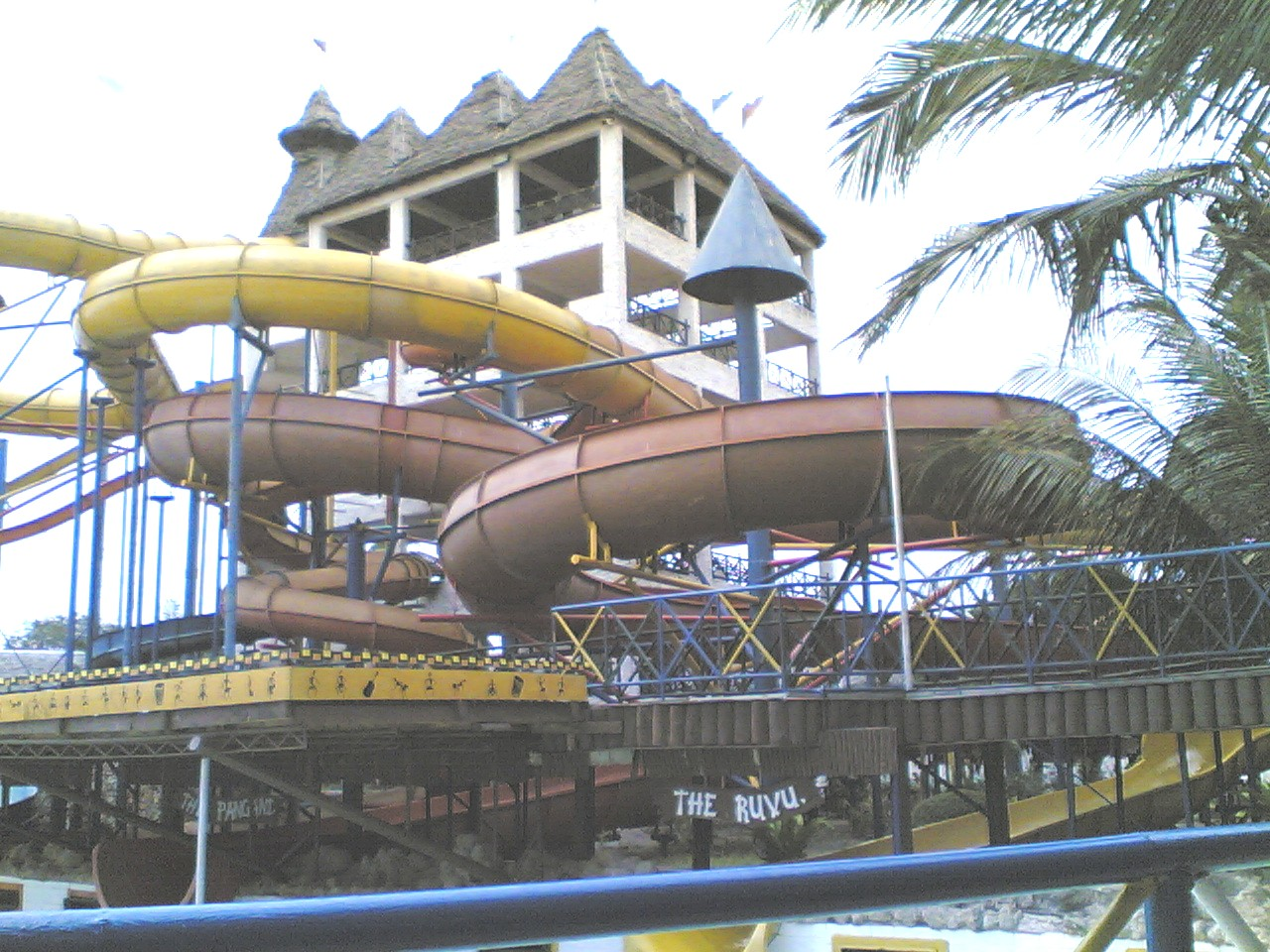
- From top to bottom: Beach at Kunduchi, Great Mosque of Kunduchi Ruins & Wet 'n' Wild Waterpark in Kunduchi
- Interactive map of Kunduchi
- Coordinates: 6°39′41.4″S 39°12′1.08″E
- Country: Tanzania
- Region: Dar es Salaam Region
- District: Kinondoni District

Area
  - Total: 27 km^{2} (10 sq mi)

Population (2012)
  - Total: 75,016

Ethnic groups
  - Settler: Swahili
  - Ancestral: Zaramo
- Tanzanian Postal Code: 14112

Kunduchi (Kata ya Kunduchi, in Swahili) is an administrative ward in Kinondoni District of the Dar es Salaam Region in Tanzania. Bunju ward forms the ward's northern boundary. The Indian Ocean borders the ward on its eastern side. Kawe, Mbezi Juu, and Wazo wards make up the southern and western borders.The Kunduchi Ruins, a National Historic Site, are located in the ward. According to the 2012 census, the ward has a population of 75,016 .

== Administration ==
The postal code for Kunduchi ward is 14122. The ward is divided into the following neighborhoods (Mitaa):

- Kilongawima
- Kondo
- Mtongani

- Pwani
- Tegeta
- Ununio

=== Government ===
The ward, like every other ward in the country, has local government offices based on the population served. The Kunduchi Ward administration building houses a court as per the Ward Tribunal Act of 1988, including other vital departments for the administration the ward. The ward has the following administration offices:

- Kunduchi Ward Police Station
- Kunduchi Ward Government Office (Afisa Mtendaji)
- Kunduchi Ward Tribunal (Baraza La Kata) is a Department inside Ward Government Office

In the local government system of Tanzania, the ward is the smallest democratic unit. Each ward is composed of a committee of eight elected council members which include a chairperson, one salaried officer (with no voting rights), and an executive officer. One-third of seats are reserved for women councillors.

== Demographics ==
The Zaramo people lived in the ward and a major portion of the district at one time. As the city progressed, the ward transformed into an international neighborhood. There are 75,016 people living in the ward.

== Education and health ==
=== Education ===
The ward is home to these educational institutions:

- Kunduchi Primary School
- Mtakuja Primary School
- Ununio Primary School
- St.Joseph's Primary School
- Royal Elite Primary School
- St.Thomas Primary School
- Pius Msekwa Primary School
- Pwani Primary School, Kunduchi
- Canosa Primary School
- Tegeta High School
- Kondo Secondary School
- The latham School
- Canossa High School
- Ghomme Secondary School
- John the Baptist High School
- Ununio Islamic Boys Secondary School
- FK Secondary School

=== Healthcare ===
The ward is home to the following health institutions:

- Ununio Dispensary
- Thereza Dispensary, Kunduchi
- RC Dispensary, Kunduchi
- New Tegeta Health Center
- Tegeta Hospital
- Elidad Hospital

== See also ==
- Historic Swahili Settlements
- Kunduchi Ruins
