= Ardhi University =

Public university in Dar es Salaam Region, Tanzania

Coordinates: 6°45′53″S 39°12′51″E

- Chuo Kikuu Ardhi (Swahili)
- Other names: ARU
- Former names: UCLAS
- Motto: Weledi. na Ustawi. (Swahili)
- Motto in English: Professionalism and Prosperity
- Type: Public
- Established: 2007; 19 years ago
- Academic affiliations: AAU, ACU
- Budget: TSh 11.86 billion (US$8.41 million)
- Chairperson: Prof. Costa R Mahalu
- Chancellor: Hon. Mohamed Chande Othman, the former Chief Justice of the United Republic of Tanzania.
- Vice-Chancellor: Prof. Evaristo J. Liwa
- Dean: Gabriel R Kassenga
- Academic staff: 237
- Administrative staff: 242
- Students: 2,613
- Undergraduates: 2,457
- Postgraduates: 156
- Location: Makongo, Kinondoni District, Dar es Salaam Region, Tanzania
- Campus: Urban
- Registration Number: CR1/004
- Website: University Website

Ardhi University also known as ARU (Chuo Kikuu Ardhi, in Swahili) is a public university located in Makongo in Kinondoni District of Dar es Salaam Region, Tanzania. It was established 28 March 2007, though it has been offering training for more than 60 years in different status. It is situated on Observation Hill close to University of Dar es Salaam, in which it was a constituent college from 1996 to 2007, when it was known as University College of Lands and Architectural Studies—UCLAS. Prior being part of University of Dar es Salaam, Ardhi University was known as Ardhi Institute with history extending to mid-1950s.

Today, academic activities at the university are generated in four schools as follows:

1. School of Architecture, Construction Economics and Management (SACEM)
2. School of Earth Sciences, Real Estates, Business and Informatics (SERBI)
3. School of Engineering and Environmental Studies (SEES)
4. School of Spatial Planning and Social Science (SSPSS)

The number of academic staff with doctoral degrees has increased from three in 1996 to 43 in 2008.

== History ==
The university was established under University Act No 7 of 2005, and came into being after the signing of Ardhi University Charter by the President of United Republic of Tanzania, Jakaya Kikwete on 28 March 2007. The roots of Ardhi University can be traced back to pre-independence days when a Surveying Training School offering technician certificate courses in land surveying was established in Dar es Salaam.

In 1974, the name was changed to Ardhi Institute and its range of courses expanded to include building design and building economics. In the early 1980s, the public health engineering course (later renamed ‘environmental engineering’) was introduced. In 1996 the Ardhi Institute became a constituent college of the University of Dar es Salaam, and ten years later was granted autonomy as Ardhi University. During the decade of association with the University of Dar es Salaam, the Ardhi Institute grew dramatically: the number of academic programmes on offer increased from six to 39, while the number of students grew from 400 to 1,400.

In 1979, the Centre for Housing Studies was established as joint project between the governments of Tanzania and the Netherlands. The centre has now grown into the Institute of Human Settlement Studies, which is involved in the ‘regularisation of informal settlements’, with which Dar es Salaam is plentifully endowed.

== Academics ==
The university currently offers undergraduate and postgraduate degrees in the following schools and an institution:

- School of Architecture, Construction Economics and Management (SACEM)
- School of Earth Sciences, Real Estates, Business and Informatics (SERBI)
- School of Environmental Science and Technology (SEST)
- School of Spatial Planning and Social Science (SSPSS)
- Institute of Human Settlement Studies (IHSS)
