= Mabwepande =

Ward of Kinondoni District, Dar es Salaam Region

Mabwepande Kata ya Mabwepande (Swahili)
- Ward of Kinondoni District
- Interactive map of Mabwepande
- Coordinates: 6°39′21.24″S 39°4′51.24″E
- Country: Tanzania
- Region: Dar es Salaam Region
- District: Kinondoni District

Area
  - Total: 52.02 km^{2} (20.09 sq mi)

Population (2012)
  - Total: 25,460

Ethnic groups
  - Settler: Swahili
  - Ancestral: Zaramo
- Tanzanian Postal Code: 14104

Mabwepande (Kata ya Mabwepande in Swahili) is an administrative ward in Kinondoni District of the Dar es Salaam Region in Tanzania. Bunju and Wazo wards form the ward's eastern boundary. The Mbezi ward of Ilala District borders the ward to the south. Pangani ward of Kibaha Town Council and Kerege ward of Bagamoyo District in Pwani Region border the wards to the west and north, respectively. According to the 2012 census, the ward has a total population of 25,460.

== Administration ==
The postal code for Mabwepande Ward is 14134. The ward is divided into the following neighborhoods (Mitaa):

- Bunju B
- Kihonzile
- Mabwe Pande
- Mbopo

=== Government ===
The ward, like every other ward in the country, has local government offices based on the population served. The Mabwepande Ward administration building houses a court as per the Ward Tribunal Act of 1988, including other vital departments for the administration the ward. The ward has the following administration offices:

- Mabwepande Ward Police Station
- Mabwepande Ward Government Office (Afisa Mtendaji)
- Mabwepande Ward Tribunal (Baraza La Kata) is a Department inside Ward Government Office

In the local government system of Tanzania, the ward is the smallest democratic unit. Each ward is composed of a committee of eight elected council members which include a chairperson, one salaried officer (with no voting rights), and an executive officer. One-third of seats are reserved for women councillors.

== Demographics ==
Like much of the district, the ward is the ancestral home of the Zaramo people. The ward evolved into a cosmopolitan ward as the city progressed over time.

== Education and health ==
=== Education ===
The ward is home to these educational institutions:

- Mjimpya Primary School
- Debugene Primary School
- Mbopo Primary School
- Kibesa Primary School
- Godiana Schools
- Libermann Boys Secondary School
- Aminz Academy
- Mabwe Secondary School
- Mbopo A Secoundary School
- Madale Palace Schools
- Tuwapende Watoto School

=== Healthcare ===
The ward is home to the following health institutions:

- Mabwepnade Hospital
- Heameda Hospital
