= Kilangalanga =

Coordinates: 6°44′31″S 38°41′55″E

Kilangalanga Kata ya Kilangalanga (Swahili)
- Ward
- Kilangalanga Ward
- Interactive map of Kilangalanga
- Country: Tanzania
- Region: Pwani Region
- District: Kibaha District

Government
  - Type: Ward Council

Area
  - Total: 16.84 km^{2} (6.50 sq mi)

Population (2022)
  - Total: 9,984
  - Density: 592.9/km^{2} (1,536/sq mi)
- Time zone: UTC+3 (East Africa Time)
- Postal code: 61206

Kilangalanga is a ward in the Pwani Region of Tanzania. It is located in Kibaha District. According to the 2022 census, the population of Kilangalanga is 2,657. There are 4,784 males and 5,200 females. There are 2,819 households with an average household size of 3.5. The ward covers an area of 16.84 km^{2} (6.50 sq mi). It has 1,946 buildings in total.
