= Gwata =

Gwata Kata ya Gwata (Swahili)
- Ward
- Gwata Ward
- Interactive map of Gwata
- Coordinates: 6°44′10″S 38°19′45″E
- Country: Tanzania
- Region: Pwani Region
- District: Kibaha District

Population (2022)
  - Total: 5,821
- Time zone: UTC+3 (East Africa Time)
- Postal code: 61206

Gwata is a ward in the Pwani Region of Tanzania. It is located in Kibaha District. According to the 2022 census, the population of Soga is 10,283. There are 2,842 males and 2,979 females. There are 2,979 households with an average household size of 3.7. The ward covers an area of 126 km^{2} (49 sq mi). It has 1,956 buildings in total.
