= Wazo, Kinondoni =

Ward of Kinondoni District, Dar es Salaam Region

Wazo Kata ya Wazo (Swahili)
- Ward of Kinondoni District
- Interactive map of Wazo
- Coordinates: 6°39′59.04″S 39°10′37.56″E
- Country: Tanzania
- Region: Dar es Salaam Region
- District: Kinondoni District

Area
  - Total: 53.2 km^{2} (20.5 sq mi)

Population (2012)
  - Total: 90,825

Ethnic groups
  - Settler: Swahili
  - Ancestral: Zaramo
- Tanzanian Postal Code: 14130

Wazo (Kata ya Wazo, in Swahili) is an administrative ward in Kinondoni District of the Dar es Salaam Region in Tanzania. The ward is surrounded to the east by the wards of Kunduchi and Kawe. The Goba and Mbezi wards of the Ubungo District, as well as Mbezi Juu, about it to the south. Mabwepande and Bunju wards form the ward's western and northern boundaries. According to the 2012 census, the ward has a population of 90,825.

== Administration ==
The postal code for Wazo Ward is 14130. The ward is divided into the following neighborhoods (Mitaa):

- Kilimahewa, Wazo
- Kilimahewa Juu
- Kisanga
- Madale

- Mivumoni
- Nakasangwe
- Salasala
- Wazo, Wazo

=== Government ===
The ward, like every other ward in the country, has local government offices based on the population served. The Wazo Ward administration building houses a court as per the Ward Tribunal Act of 1988, including other vital departments for the administration the ward. The ward has the following administration offices:

- Wazo Ward Police Station
- Wazo Ward Government Office (Afisa Mtendaji)
- Wazo Ward Tribunal (Baraza La Kata) is a Department inside Ward Government Office

In the local government system of Tanzania, the ward is the smallest democratic unit. Each ward is composed of a committee of eight elected council members which include a chairperson, one salaried officer (with no voting rights), and an executive officer. One-third of seats are reserved for women councillors.

== Demographics ==
The ward is where the Zaramo people once lived, along with a large portion of the district. As the city developed, the ward transformed into a global neighborhood.

== Education and health ==
=== Education ===
The ward is home to these educational institutions:

- Nuru Njema Primary School
- Naksangwe Primary School
- Kid's Heaven Primary School
- Benaco Primary School
- Elesia Christabel Primary School
- Salasala Primary School
- Atlas Madael Primary School
- Maarifa Islamic Primary School
- Uwata Madale Primary School
- Maendeleo Secondary School
- Twiga Secondary School
- Kingdom Primary School
- Rehema High School
- Maendeleo Secondary School
- Omega College, Wazo
- Cornelious Girls High School
- Feza International School, Wazo
- Greenarces Secondary School
- Kisauke Secoundary School
- Maere School
- Patrick Mission Secondary School

=== Healthcare ===
The ward is home to the following health institutions:

- Sabina Health Center
- Kitengule Hospital
- Rabinisia Memorial Hospital
- Salasala Health Center
- Madale Health Center
