= Kimbamanduka =

Kimbamanduka (fl. 19th-century) was a Tanzanian elephant hunter, warrior and pazi (chief) of the Zaramo people in the Pugu Hills area.

From oral history, Kimbamanduka is remembered for helping the Mzizima (now, Dar es Salaam) people for protection against the attacks and expansion of the Kamba people from Kenya. Kimbamanduka's army successfully drove the Kamba away; as a reward, the Zaramo gained the right to collect taxes in the Buguruni, Mtoni and Kurasini areas. The Zaramo also migrated and mixed with the local Barawa and Shirazi population.
