= Dutumi =

Coordinates: 6°52′18″S 38°34′19″E

Dutumi Kata ya Dutumi (Swahili)
- Ward
- Interactive map of Dutumi
- Country: Tanzania
- Region: Pwani Region
- District: Kibaha District

Population (2022)
  - Total: 6,544
- Time zone: UTC+3 (East Africa Time)
- Postal code: 61206

Dutumi is a village and a ward in the Pwani Region of Tanzania. According to the 2022 census, the population of Soga is 6,544.

== Administration ==
Soga ward is subdivided into the following villages: Mwembengozi, Dutumi, Madege, and Kimalamisale.
