= Janga, Tanzania =

Coordinates: 6°47′29″S 38°45′02″E

Janga Kata ya Janga (Swahili)
- Ward
- Janga Ward
- Interactive map of Janga
- Country: Tanzania
- Region: Pwani Region
- District: Kibaha District

Population (2022)
  - Total: 15,524
- Time zone: UTC+3 (East Africa Time)
- Postal code: 61206

Janga is a ward in the Pwani Region of Tanzania. It is located in Kibaha District. According to the 2022 census, the population of Janga is 15,524, making it the highest-populated ward in Kibaha. There are 7,335 males and 8,189 females. There are 4,639 households with an average household size of 3.3. The ward covers an area of 3.471 km^{2} (1.340 sq mi). It has 2,682 buildings in total.
