= Kibaha =

Capital of Pwani Region, Tanzania

Kibaha Jiji la Kibaha (Swahili)
- City of Pwani Region
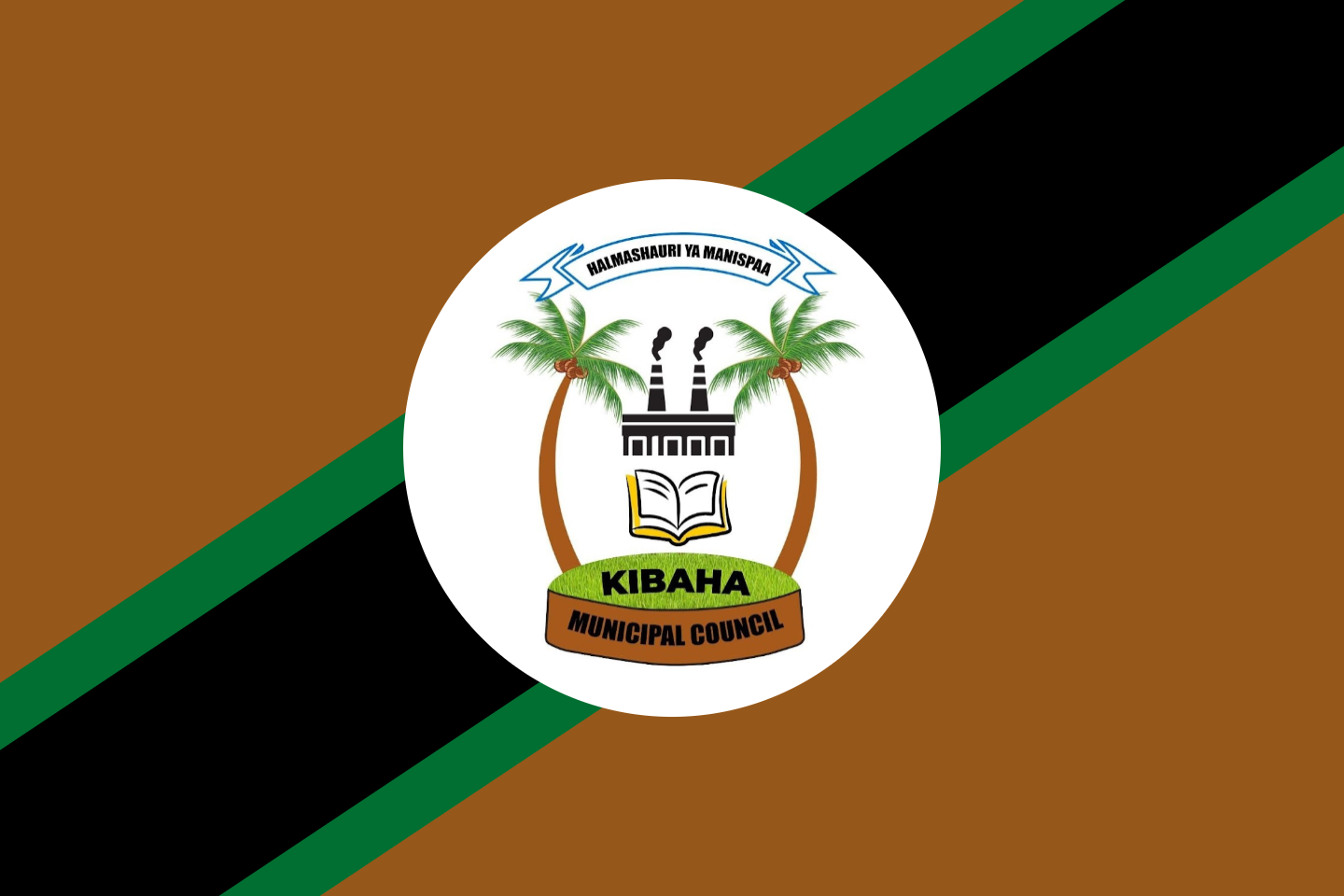
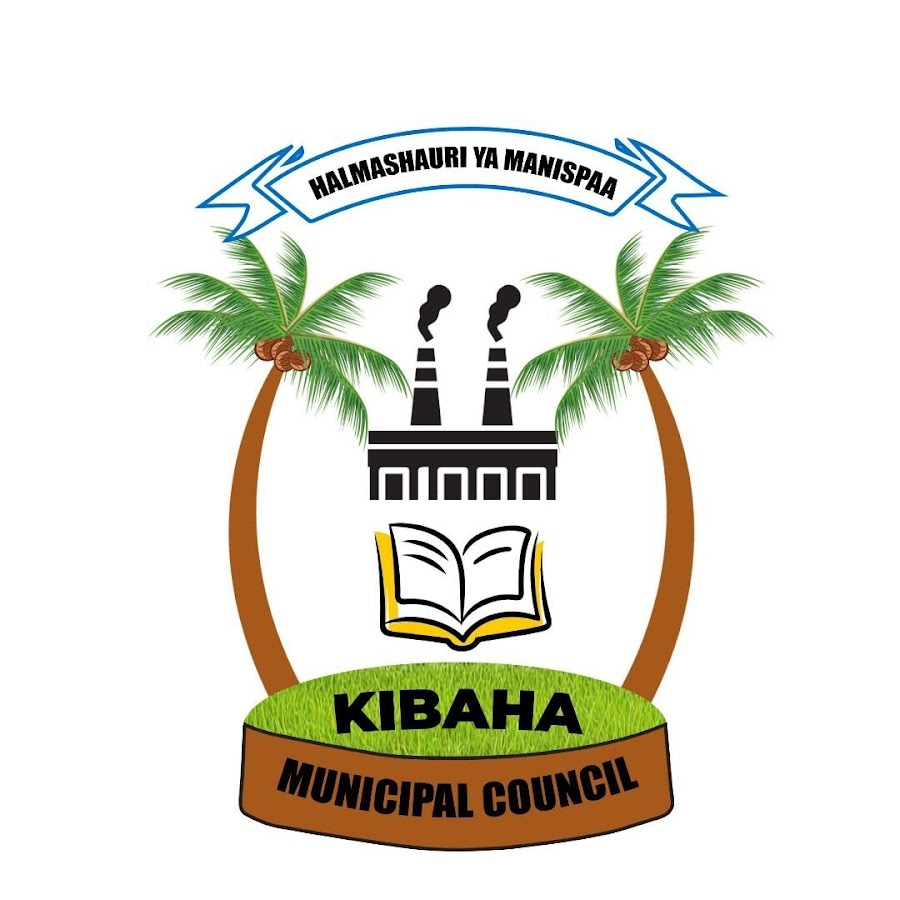
- Flag Emblem

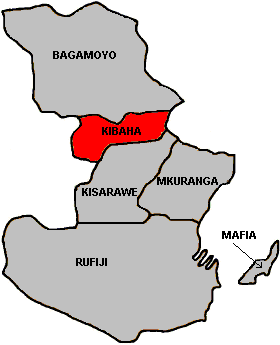
- District

- Location in Tanzania
- Coordinates: 6°46′S 38°55′E
- Country: Tanzania
- Region: Pwani
- District: Kibaha

Government
  - Type: Township

Population (2022 census)
  - Urban: 265,360
- Time zone: UTC+3 (East Africa Time)
- Area code: 023
- Website: Regional Website

Kibaha is the capital of Pwani Region in eastern Tanzania, located in Kibaha District. As of the 2022 census, Kibana had a population of 265,360.

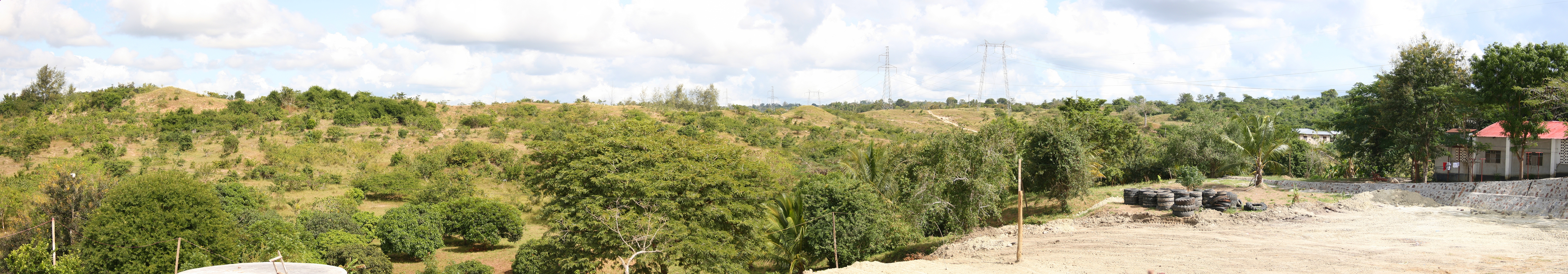
Landscape of Kibaha

== Education ==
Kibaha hosts the Kibaha Education Centre.

== Transport ==
=== Road ===
Kibaha is served by the A7.
