= Kibaha District =

District of Pwani Region, Tanzania

Kibaha Ward Wilaya ya Kibaha (Swahili)
- District
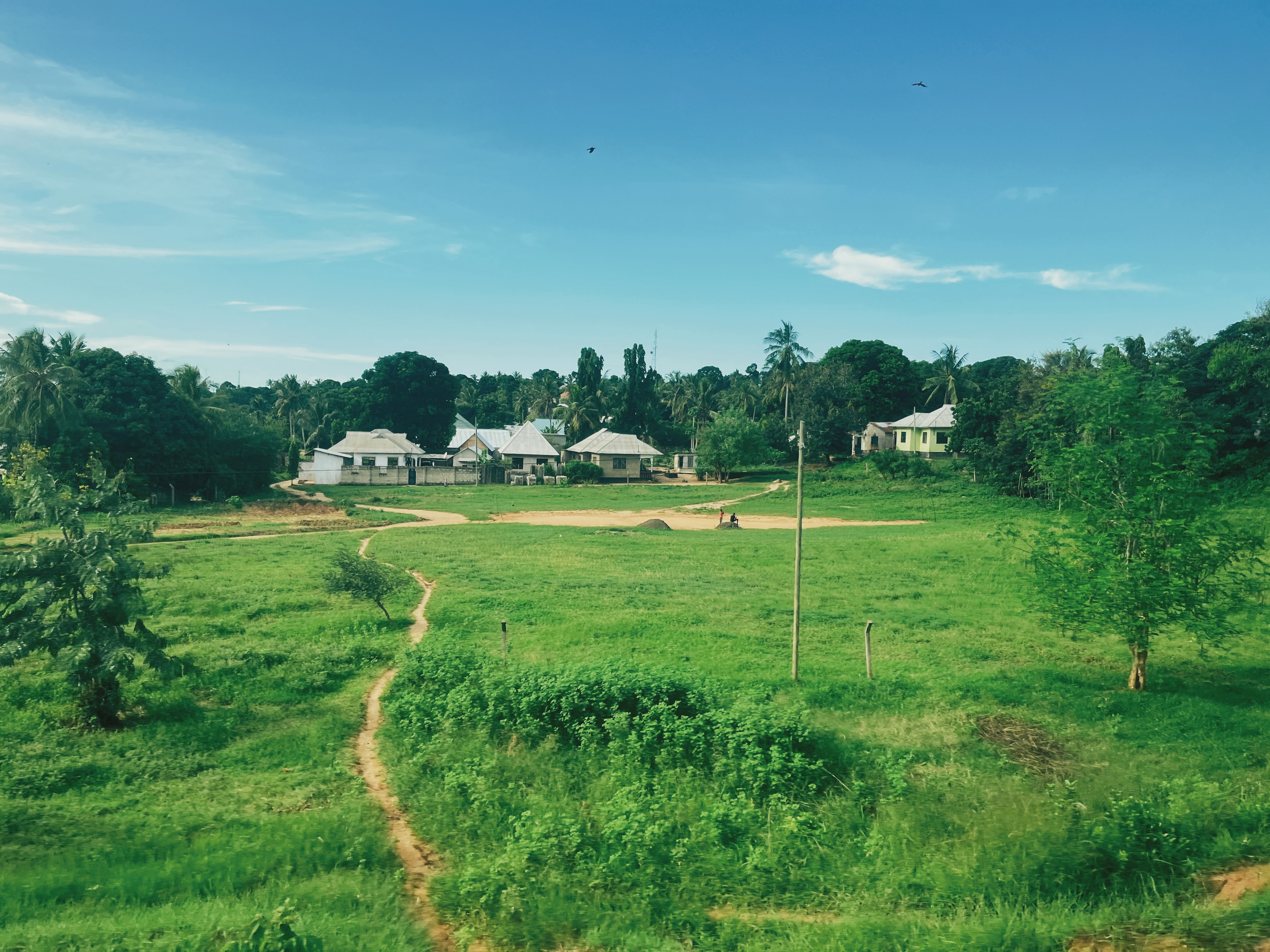
- Mlandizi Landscape, Kibaha District
- Nickname: It is here
- Kibaha District in Pwani
- Coordinates: 6°49′22″S 38°36′46″E
- Country: Tanzania
- Region: Pwani Region
- Capital: Mlandizi
- Wards: Wards: Bokomnemela; Dutumi; Gwata; Janga; Kawawa; Kikongo; Kilangalanga; Kwala; Magindu; Mlandizi; Mtambani; Mtongani; Ruvu; Soga

Area
  - Total: 1,502 km^{2} (580 sq mi)
  - Rank: 7/9 in Pwani Region

Population (2022)
  - Total: 123,367
  - Density: 82.14/km^{2} (212.7/sq mi)
- Demonym: Kibahan

Ethnic groups
  - Settler: Swahili
  - Native: Zaramo
- Website: https://kibahadc.go.tz/

Kibaha is one of nine administrative districts of Pwani Region in Tanzania. The name means 'it is here' in Zaramo. The district covers an area of 1,502 km^{2} (580 sq mi). Kibaha is bordered to the northeast by Kibaha Urban District and the north by Chalinze District. The district is bordered to the southeast by the Kisarawe District, On the western side the district is bordered by Morogoro District of Morogoro Region. The district seat (capital) is the town and ward of Mlandizi. According to the 2022 census, the district has a total population of 123,367.

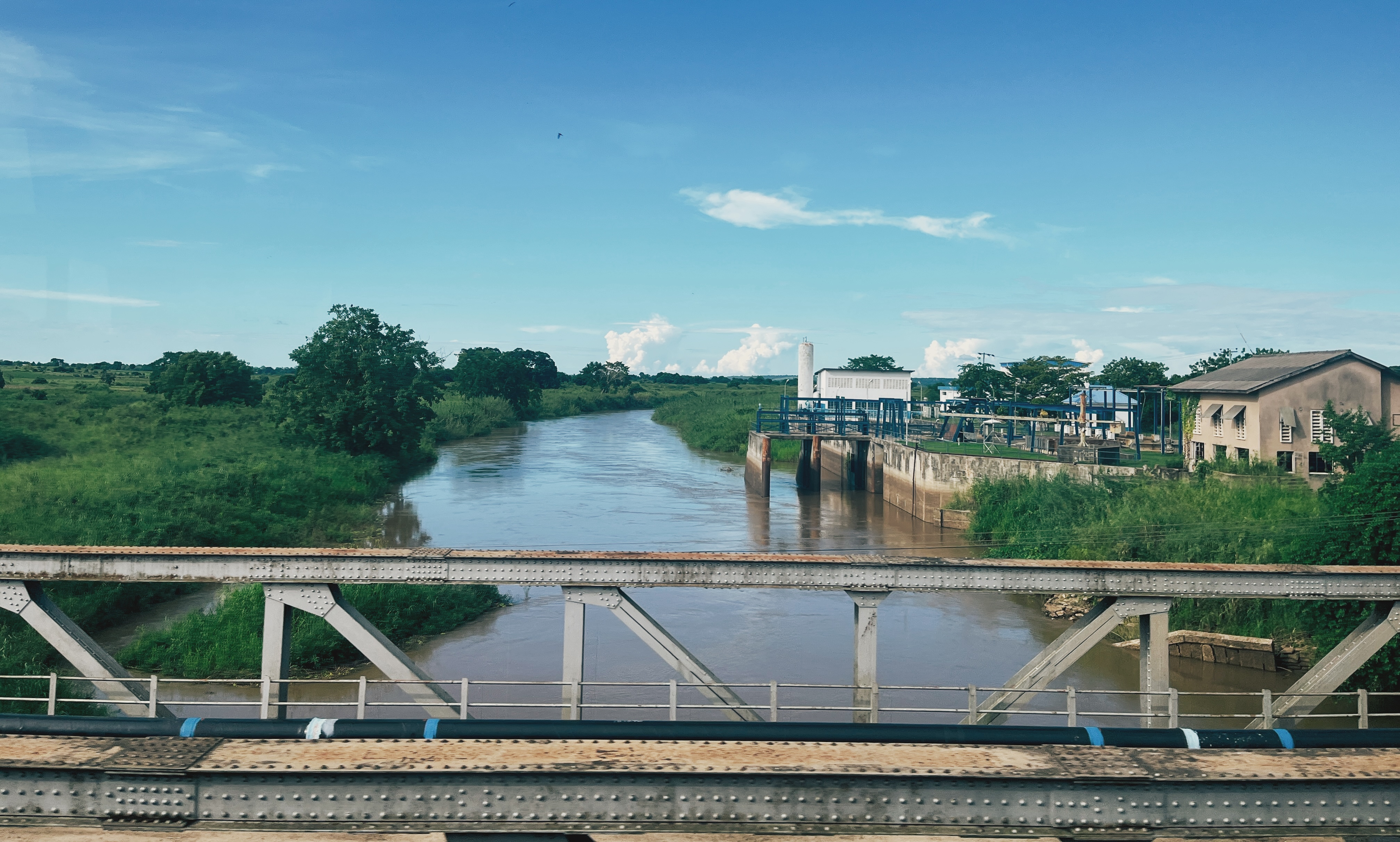
Bridge over Ruvu, Mlandizi Ward

== Population ==
According to the 2022 census, Kibaha District has a population of 123,367, with a fairly balanced gender distribution of 61,220 males and 62,147 females. The age distribution indicates a young population, with a significant number of residents under 15 years old.

== Administrative subdivisions ==
Kibaha District is administratively divided into 14 wards.

1. Bokomnemela
2. Dutumi
3. Gwata
4. Janga
5. Kawawa
6. Kikongo
7. Kilangalanga
8. Kwala
9. Magindu
10. Mlandizi
11. Mtambani
12. Mtongani
13. Ruvu
14. Soga

== Economy ==
The economy in Kibaha experienced significant growth, largely driven by the development of the Kwala Satellite City. This US$ 3 billion project, expected to be completed in 2024, is set to house over 200 industries producing food products, pharmaceuticals, industrial and transport material.

== Transport ==
Transport infrastructure in Kibaha district is also undergoing major improvements. The construction of Tanzania's first toll expressway, a 215-kilometer road from Kibaha to Morogoro, is set to be completed in 2024. This four-lane expressway will facilitate faster travel and reduce congestion on the current highway, enhancing connectivity within the region and supporting economic activities.

Kibaha also has multiple stops for both the old Central Line railway and the newer electric train.

== Natural Features ==
The Ruvu River is a notable geographical feature within the district. The Bagala Forest Reserve is a significant natural reserve in the area.

== Education & Health ==
As of 2022, there were 8 secondary schools. In terms of healthcare facilities, as of 2022, Kibaha district is home to 3 health centers and 24 dispensaries.
