= Ruvu, Kibaha District =

Town and ward in Tanzania

Coordinates: 6°48′30″S 38°39′30″E

Ruvu Kata ya Ruvu
- Ward of Kibaha District
- Interactive map of Ruvu
- Country: Tanzania
- Region: Pwani Region
- District: Kibaha District

Population (2022)
  - Total: 4,111

Ruvu is a small town and ward (shehia) located in the Kibaha District of the Pwani Region in eastern Tanzania, west of Dar es Salaam. As of 2022, the ward population was 4,111.

== Transport ==
The town is served by a junction station on the Central Railway of Tanzania Railways Corporation. From the junction, a branch proceeds cross-country to join the Tanga line near Mnyusi. The branch diverges on the west side of the town, and the link was opened in August 1963.

== Namesakes ==
There are two other towns in Tanzania with the same name.

== See also ==
- Railway stations in Tanzania
