= Soga, Tanzania =

Soga Kata ya Soga (Swahili)
- Ward
- Location in Tanzania
- Coordinates: 6.83341°S 38.86532°E
- Country: Tanzania
- Region: Pwani Region
- District: Kibaha District

Population (2022)
  - Total: 10,283
- Time zone: UTC+3 (East Africa Time)
- Postal code: 61206

Soga is a village and a ward in the Pwani Region of Tanzania. It is located in Kibaha District. It is bordered to the east by Bokomnemela ward, to the west by Kikongo ward, to the north by Chalinze District and to the south by Kisarawe District. According to the 2022 census, the population of Soga is 10,283.

== Administration ==
Soga ward is subdivided into the following villages: Soga, Kipangege, Vikuge, and Misufini.

== Economy ==
Soga houses a major $10 million meat processing factory that produces 100 tonnes of beef daily for the export market of United Arab Emirates, Oman, Qatar, Saudi Arabia, China, Indonesia, Vietnam and Malaysia.

== Transport ==
Soga is one of the stops on the Central Line railway from Dar es Salaam to Kigoma. There is also a train station in Soga on the first section of the new electric Tanzania Standard Gauge Railway from Dar es Salaam to Morogoro.
