= Goba, Ubungo =

Ward of Ubungo District, Dar es Salaam Region

Goba Kata ya Goba (Swahili)
- Ward of Ubungo District
- From top to bottom
- Interactive map of Goba
- Coordinates: 6°50′59.64″S 39°14′43.08″E
- Country: Tanzania
- Region: Dar es Salaam Region
- District: Ubungo District

Area
  - Total: 47.2 km^{2} (18.2 sq mi)

Population (2022)
  - Total: 140,572

Ethnic groups
  - Settler: Swahili
  - Ancestral: Zaramo
- Tanzanian Postal Code: 16112

Goba (Kata ya Goba in Swahili) is an administrative ward in Ubungo District of the Dar es Salaam Region in Tanzania. The ward borders the wards of Mbezi to the west, Kawe to the east, Mivumoni to the north, and Makongo to the south. It covers a combination of urban and peri-urban areas, experiencing rapid population growth due to urban expansion and settlement developments.

According to the 2012 Population and Housing Census conducted by the Government of Tanzania, Goba Ward had a population of 42,669. More recent statistics from the 2022 census indicate significant growth: the Urban Ward of Goba in Ubungo Municipal now has an estimated 140,572 residents, with approximately 66,800 males and 73,700 females.

== Administration ==
The postal code for Goba Ward is 16112. The ward is divided into the following neighborhoods (Mitaa):

- Goba
- Kinzudi
- Kibululu
- Kulangwa

- Kunguru
- Matosa
- Muungano
- Tegeta "A"

=== Government ===
Goba Ward is one of the administrative wards in Ubungo District, located in Dar es Salaam Region, Tanzania. The ward was established under the Local Government (Urban Authorities) Act No. 8 of 1982, which provides for the creation of administrative units to enhance governance and service delivery at the community level. Goba Ward operates under the Ubungo Municipal Council and serves as the closest link between the local government and the community.

The Goba Ward administration building houses a court as per the Ward Tribunal Act of 1988, including other vital departments for the administration of the ward. The ward has the following administration offices:

- Goba Ward Police Station
- Goba Ward Government Office (Afisa Mtendaji)
- Goba Ward Tribunal (Baraza La Kata) is a Department inside Ward Government Office

In the local government system of Tanzania, the ward is the smallest democratic unit. Each ward comprises a committee of eight elected council members, including a chairperson, one salaried officer (with no voting rights), and an executive officer. One-third of seats are reserved for women councilors.

== Demographics ==
The ward serves as the Zaramo's ancestral home along with a sizable chunk of the district. The ward changed over time into a cosmopolitan ward as the city grew.

== Education and health ==
=== Education ===
The ward is home to these educational institutions:

- Goba Primary School
- Lilian Kibo Secondary School
- Kings Primary and Secondary School, Goba
- Jaka Elite Primary School
- Precious Primary School, Goba
- Goba Secondary School
- Fahari Secondary School
- Vitoria Adonai Primary School
- Mpakani Secondary School

=== Healthcare ===
The ward is home to the following health institutions:

- Goba Health Center
- Goba Birthing Center
- Kalita Prinmat Maternity Home
- Ebenezer Health Center
- Exodus Health Center
- Vision Care Eye Clinic, Goba
- B&B Specialized Clinic
- JPM Health Center, Goba
