= Zaramo people =

Ethnic group from Eastern Tanzania

Zaramo
Wazaramo

Total population
- ~0.7 million

Regions with significant populations
- Tanzania Dar es Salaam Region (Temeke District, Ilala District, Ubungo District, Kinondoni District, Kigamboni District) Pwani Region (Chalinze District),(Mkuranga District), (Kisarawe District), (Kibaha District)

Languages
- Zaramo & Swahili language

Religion
- Islam (Sunni); African Traditional Religion

Related ethnic groups
- Lugulu, Kutu, Kwere & other Bantu peoples, Somali Bantus and Afro-Arabs

- Person: Mzaramo
- People: Wazaramo
- Language: Kizaramo

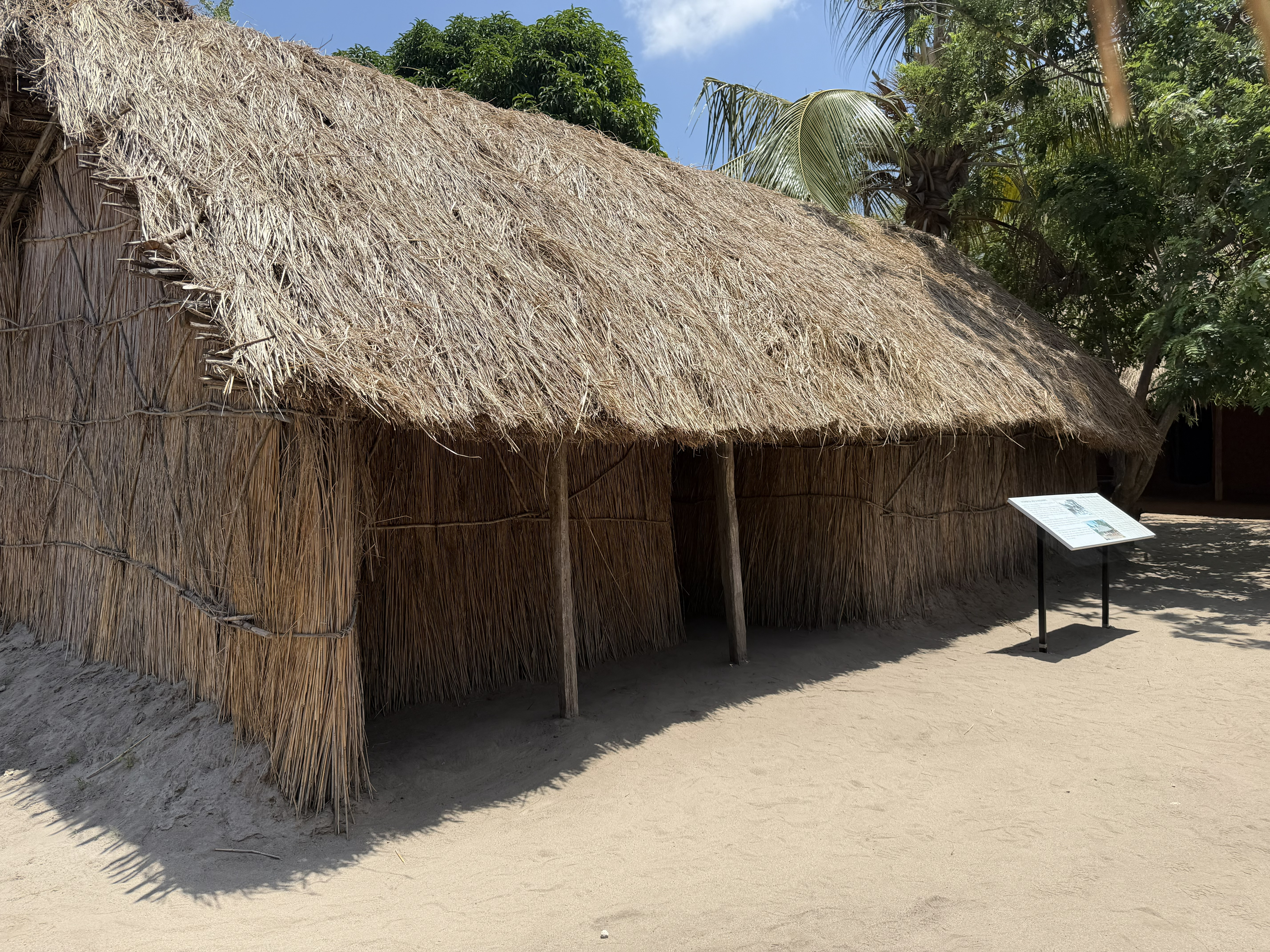
Outside look of traditional house of Zaramos tribe.

The Zaramo people, also referred to as Dzalamo or Saramo (Wazaramo, in Swahili), are a Bantu ethnic group native to the central eastern coast of Tanzania, particularly the Dar es Salaam Region and Pwani Region. They are the largest ethnic group in and around Dar es Salaam, the former capital of Tanzania and the 7th largest city in Africa. Estimated to be about 0.7 million people, over 98% of them are Muslims, more specifically of the Shafi'i school of Sunni Islam. Zaramo people are considered influential in Tanzania's popular culture, with musical genres like singeli originating from their community in Dar es Salaam. Their culture and history have been shaped by their lifes in both urban and rural landscapes.

== Language ==
The original Zaramo language, sometimes called Kizaramo, is Bantu and belongs to the Niger-Congo family of languages. However, in contemporary Tanzania, only a few people still speak it, and most speak Swahili language as their first language, as it is the trading language of the East African coast and the national language of Tanzania.

Kizaramo is still used in many Zaramo rituals, such as the mwali rites, though they often appear alongside Swahili translations.

== History ==
=== Origins ===
By oral tradition, the Zaramo are said to be descendants of the Shomvi people under the lead of the warrior-hero, Pazi in the early 19th century. The Shomvi, a mercantile clan living in what is present-day Dar Es Salaam were attacked by an offshoot group of Kamba people from Kenya. The Shomvi sought help from the warrior, Pazi, who lived in the hinterlands. When Pazi defeated the Kamba, he asked for salt, cloth, and other luxuries in return. When the Shomvi could not meet his demands, they offered for him and his family to live with them on the coast, where they would receive an annual tribute instead. The war and its results were said to be the founding of the Zaramo.

=== Islamization ===
Undoubtedly after the Maji Maji rebellion, it was a period of significant Islamic expansion. Before 1914, the Ngindo, Zaramo, and Zigua peoples in the coastal hinterland had been heavily influenced by Islam. Since then, the region has primarily become Islamic, with the exception of Maasai, some of Bonde (whom had a long history of missions), and to a lesser extent, Matumbi. The last barrier to the Islamization of the Digo in the north was eliminated by the destruction of Lutheran artifacts. When missionary work began in the south after many Mwera and Makua stopped practicing Christianity, polygynous marriages and other barriers made it difficult for many converts to return, which led to Islam becoming the coastal area's major religion.

By 1913, Muslims were up half of the Zaramo population. Both from the coast and up north from the Rufiji, where Zaramo tracked the boys' jando initiation ceremony that contributed significantly to the spread of Islam, proselytizing had taken place. Zaramo started performing Islamic circumcision.

Islam in the coastal region and its hinterland typically made it difficult for missions to be effective. The Benedictines relocated their operations inland as a result of Zaramo's disregard. Resources for resistance were offered by indigenous religious organizations like the Kubandwa Cult and the Uwuxala Society. Long-established populations were not always opposed to Christianity, though.

Only eleven of the 150–200 waalimu in Uzaramo were reported to be able to interpret the Koran rather than merely recite it in 1912, when it was claimed that students at Koran schools learned the Koran in Arabic without grasping its meaning. Magic and literacy frequently intertwined. It was customary to read the entire Koran aloud to honor ancestors or to purify a community. A passage from the Koran served as a standard amulet, and ink diluted in water served as a standard medication.

A Zaramo Muslim immigrant worker named Abdulrahman Saidi Mboga is credited with introducing superior rice varieties and irrigation methods to South Pare.

It is simpler to map out Islam's political stance by the 1950s. Not only was it growing almost as quickly as Christianity, but Muslims also appeared to be adhering to their religion more rigidly than before. However, a lot of cultural resistance endured. Few Zaramo Muslims frequented mosques, and their female rituals remained largely non-Islamic. Urban Islam was occasionally quite superficial, notably in Dar es Salaam. Even the ostensibly Muslim Ngindo rarely performed Islamic marriage.

=== Colonial period ===
During the British period, the founding members of the African Association included representatives from the three most influential African communities in Dar es Salaam in the 1920s: the Manyema, and Zaramo. Effendi Plantan, the former head of the ex-askari community, had raised its secretary, Kleist Sykes. Mzee Sudi, the Manyema leader for the Belgian Congo branch and the son of slave parents, was one of the committee members. He also had a significant home. Two notable leaders were from the Zaramo: Ramadhani Ali, the first vice-president and a trader, and Ali Saidi, a building inspector who served as the association's treasurer during the 1930s.

Both later served as leaders of the Wazaramo Union, with Ramadhani Ali serving as King of the Marini and one of the most prominent Africans in Dar es Salaam. These men had completely different interests and unifying principles than Watts or Matola did. The organisation was split throughout the 1930s between proponents of a territorial alliance of educated men and supporters of harmony between the various social classes in the city.

Africans in the town were governed by the Germans via a liwali. The British first established a Township Authority made up of selected Europeans and Asians before experimenting with a number of "native administrations." The town was made into a separate district and divided into six wards, one under each elder. Finally, in 1941, the Township Authority received a native affairs sub-committee and its first African members. These measures included making a Zaramo headman the chief of the entire township, establishing a council of six elders, each of whom represented a grouping of tribes from one direction, and making the town a separate district.

Population increase altered Dar es Salaam's entire character. Many Zaramo settlements, particularly Buguruni, were subsumed by the shanty cities the immigrants established. Magomeni had a population density that was more than double that of Nyamwezi, although many Zaramo lived in Buguruni in the far west, which blended into the surrounding landscape.

According to a survey conducted in 1956, the majority of homes were constructed using small business owners' or artists' money. It also revealed that several ethnic groups, like the Manyema, Yao, and Makonde who were among the town's first settlers, possessed a large number of homes. However, it is noteworthy that neither Shomvi nor Zaramo had much real estate because Dar es Salaam's explosive growth from humble beginnings had engulfed both native groups. Nobody took Shomvi and Zaramo seriously when they both occasionally asserted that they "owned" the town. Shomvi were primarily fishermen, while Zaramo, who came from a less developed educational region, were "very submerged"—a characteristic that set Dar es Salaam apart from the other capitals of East Africa.

The tribal associations of the 1950s were heavily focused on rural improvement in addition to urban welfare. The Wazaramo Union was the best illustration. The Zaramo did not require an association to bury or care for them because he lived so near to the town. However, the Wazaramo Union was home to about 3,500 of the 6,500 tribal union members who were enrolled in Dar es Salaam in 1955. Its main priority was to promote rural Uzaramo.

The objective of the Zaaramo Union according to its secretary, was to construct the "UNITY, BESTIR LIFT UP", of the Wazaramo and their country in the essential matters. To this end, it purchased and operated two lorries to transport people and agricultural produce between towns and rural areas, established nine branches in the tribal area, and campaigned against "the old out-of-date Wakilis" recognized by the government, urging instead a paramount chief to guide the Zaramo toward progress. Urban ethnicity was not just a means of survival, but also a productive effort to forge groups that could work well together in colonial society.

== Society ==
The term, "Zaramo," in scholarly studies also reflects a macro-ethnic group. The larger Zaramo group consists of Zaramo proper, but includes a number of related peoples such as the Kaguru, Kwere, Kutu, Kami, Sagara, Luguru, Ngulu and Vidunda peoples.

The majority of the peoples of Tanganyika were patrilineal, but there are signs that many of them were once matrilineal. Some of these matrilineal peoples, like the Zaramo, Luguru, Mwera, and Makonde, were able to survive in the south-east where tsetse may have prevented men from acquiring cattle to pass on to their sons.

The Zaramo society has been historically victimized by slave raids and slave trading by the Swahili-Arab traders of Zanzibar. To resist this persecution, they developed stockade-fortified villages. Many ran away from the coast, and would return during the daytime to farm and fish. Zanzibar Arabs, state William Worger, Nancy Clark and Edward Alpers, however pursued their slave raiding into the mainland, where they would seize pagan Zaramo adults and children, gag them so they would not cry out, and then sell them to the traders. Sometimes during famines, such as in the 19th-century rule of Barghash bin Said of Zanzibar, desperate Zaramo people pawned and sold each other to survive.

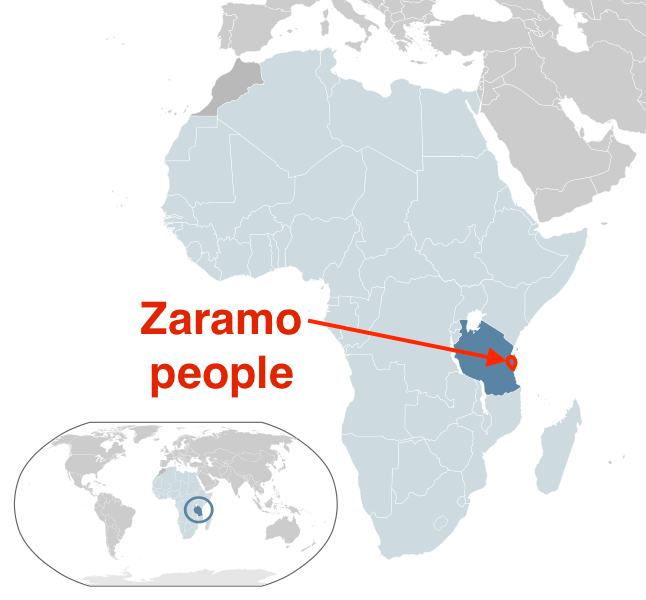
Zaramo people distribution (approx)

The Zaramo society's history has long been influenced by the coastal encounter between the Arab-Persian and African populations typical of East Africa, since the 8th century. During the colonial era, the influence came from the encounter between the African people, Arab-Swahili trader intermediaries and the European powers, but it broadly coopted the older slave-driven, social stratification model.

According to Elke Stockreiter – a professor of History specializing on Africa, the slaves seized from Zaramo people and other ethnic groups such as Yao, Makonde and Nyamwezi peoples from the mainland and brought to the coastal Tanzania region and Zanzibar sought social inclusion and attempted to reduce their treatment as inferiors by their slave owners by adopting and adapting to Islam in the 19th century. Conversion to Islam among the coastal Zaramo people began in the 19th century. These historic events, states Stockreiter, have influenced the politics and inter-ethnic relations in 20th-century Tanzania.

== Initiation ==
Initiation rituals are required for the youth of the Zaramo people to become full-fledged members of adult society. Theses rituals generally happen around puberty and the female's first menses.

=== Males ===
The male ceremony is termed as nhulu or "growth." The initiation process takes place during the dry season and about once every three years. Each novice, mwali, have a designated instructor, mhunga, who guides the youth through the circumcision process, teaches Zaramo sex lore and practice. Once the mwali are circumcised, they are brought to an initiation hut, kumbi, where they are taught, and then are not permitted to bathe for two weeks. Once the mwali are allowed to bathe again, their mothers in the village hold a village dance, mbiga. After eight more days the mwali return to the village and their instructors burn the kumbi and anything else related to the initiation. The mwali are now men of society and celebrate with mlao, a dance of emergence.

=== Females ===
Female initiation begins with a girl's first menses. The rituals associated with female initiation are performed to protect and enrich a girl's female power and her fertility. A girl has a reproductive cycle within society-one that starts with her first menses, continues to her initiation, marriage, birth of her children, and finally ends with the puberty of her grandchildren, at which point her reproductive cycle is over. The girl novice, also called mwali, is secluded in her mother's house for anywhere between two weeks and one year. Earlier documentation states that this process in the past could have taken up to five years. The mwali's paternal aunt is usually assigned as her shangazi, or the one who takes over the mwali's teachings and ceremonies. The initiate is taught domestic responsibilities such as housekeeping, childcare, sexual and moral behavior, and mature interaction in society. During seclusion, the mwali is not allowed to speak, work, or go outside, to symbolize her death and put emphasis on her re-emergence as symbolic birth. She is then carried to a mkole tree where is circumcised as well by an operator, or mnhunga. She is then returned to her family and she is celebrated with an mbwelo dance.

=== Mwana Hiti figures ===
Mwana Hiti figures may also be referred to as mwana nya kiti, mwana nya nhiti, or mwana mkongo. These names stem from mwana, meaning "child," and nya kiti and nya nhiti meaning "wood" and "chair." Mkongo refers to the mkongo tree, of which many mwana hiti are carved from. All of these names refer to the mwana hiti as a "child of wood." Mwana hiti may be represented in other forms besides figures such as walking sticks, staff, stool, musical instruments, and grave posts among others. Mwana hiti don't belong to individuals, but to families, and they are passed down generations, sometimes up to 40 or 50 years.

==== Appearance ====
Mwana hiti are usually made of wood, however some Zaramo traditions say they should be made of gourds as gourds are symbols of fertility. Sizes of the mwana hiti vary, the average being around 10 centimeters. They can be projections of a child, a woman with a child, or an mwali. Mwana hiti are cylindrical figures with depictions of a head and torso of relatively equal size and usually no arms, legs or genitalia. Breasts and a navel are often present as well as hair. Facial features are simple and abstract, occasionally not being present. These figures may be decorated with metal (if hair is present) or white beads as jewelry.

==== Function ====
Mwali hiti are meant to spark a "nurturing consciousness" within the mwali to instill a desire to have children. They also act as the main socializing for the mwali during her seclusion, measuring her skills as a future mother and teaching her the responsibilities of womanhood (i.e. taking care of oneself and children.)

Mwali must treat the mwana hiti as her child, bathing it, oiling it, dressing the hair (of which the mwali wears the same style,) and feeding it. If she fails to complete these motherly tasks she may be denied fertility in the future. Fertility is prized in Zaramo culture as children are seen as economic and cultural goals for prosperity and legacy.

If a woman encounters fertility after her initiation is over, she may choose to repeat seclusion and mwana hiti rites. This means the mwana hiti can also double as a tambiko, or "sacrifice," as a means to create stronger ties with the spiritual world.

==== Creating mwana hiti ====
Men are the carvers of mwana hiti, many creating reputations for their highly sought after figures. Mwana hiti are only commissioned, and there cannot be more than one figure commissioned by a family at a time. Carvers also cannot create mwali hiti if a family already possesses one. The carver creates mwana hiti out of one piece of wood (or gourd) that he picks out, though any decorations for hair or jewelry must be provided by the family.

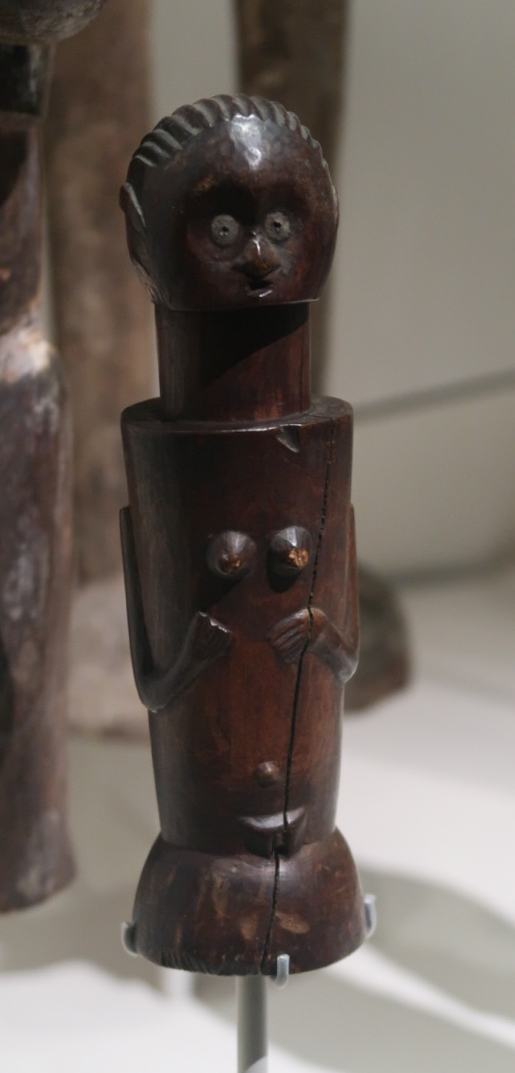
Mwana hiti figure from Musée des Confluences in Lyon, France

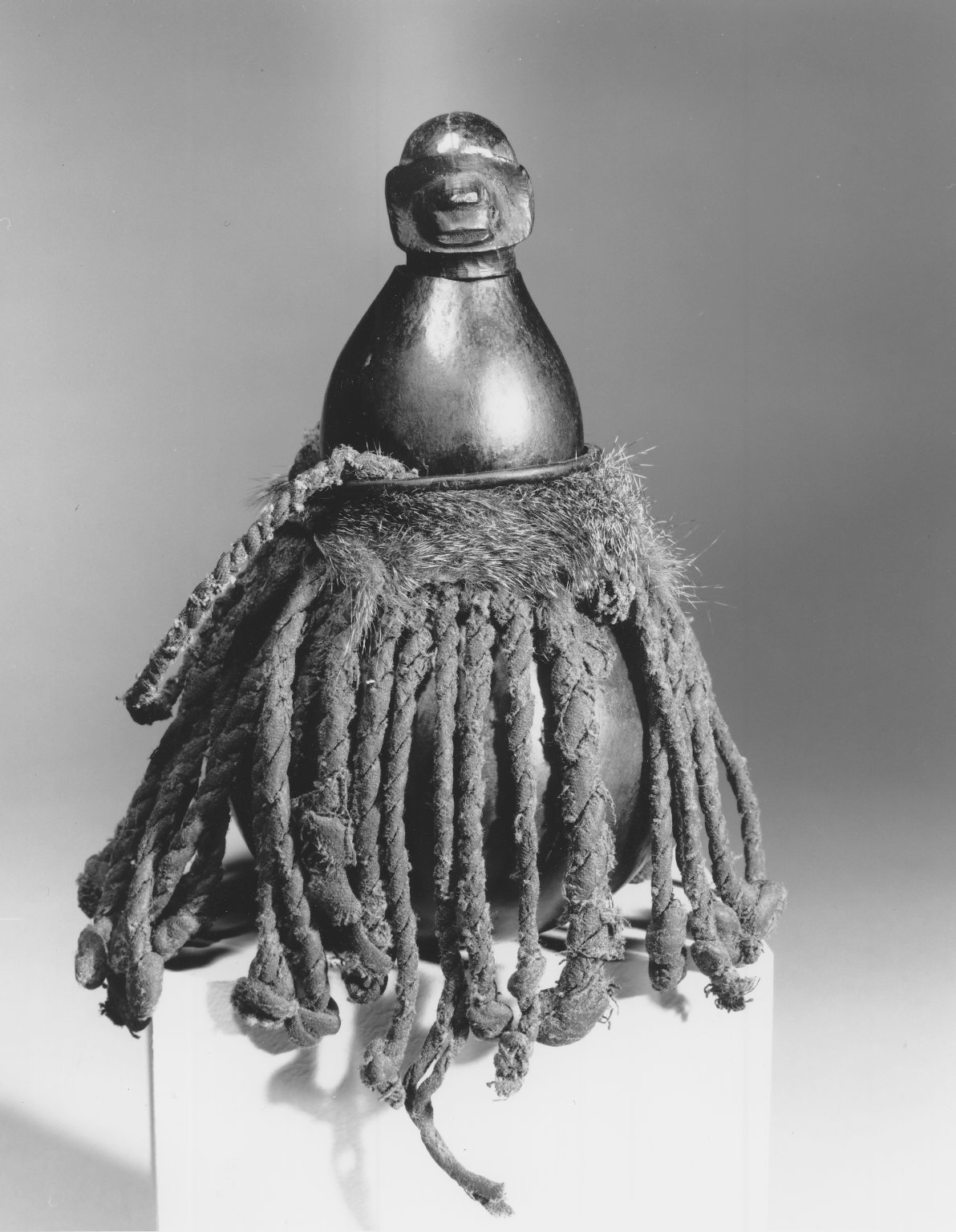
Zaramo medicine man's container

== Culture and livelihood ==
The Zaramo people have borrowed from the general Swahili and from Arab culture in terms of dress such as wearing a skull cap, Islamic festivals and Muslim observances, but they continue some of their pre-Islamic traditions such as matrilineal kinship, while a few pursue the Kolelo fertility cult and the worship of their ancient deity Mulungu. The traditional practice of Mganga or medicine man, who similar to Muslim clerics offers services as a divine healer, remains popular among the impoverished Zaramo communities.

The Zaramo people are settled farmers who also keep livestock. Many have become migrant workers in Dar es Salaam and tourist sites, considering business, or biashara, their job. They live in pangone or shanty clusters of villages. They produce staple foods such as rice, millet, maize, sorghum, and cassava, as well as cash crops such as coconuts, legumes, cashews, pineapples, oranges, and bananas. Cassava is important to Zaramo agriculture because it can grow with very little rain.

For Zaramo people who live on the coast, fishing is also popular for both personal consumption and trade. Some Zaramo may also choose to brew beer, make charcoal, or dig for copal for a living. Those with specialized professions, called mafundi, or as healers and diviners, mganga, rarely work in these jobs full-time, but also in agriculture to earn their livelihoods.

=== Formation of United Republic of Tanzania (Tanzanian independence) ===
The independence of Tanganyika in 1961 and the Zanzibar Archipelago in 1963 and their subsequent formation of the United Republic of Tanzania led to a significant shift in Tanzanian culture, as well as the Zaramo culture. In 1963, 132 chiefs and headmen were removed from their political positions as government executives. The decreased status of chiefs and headmen has led to the dwindling of their numbers and traditions associated with them.

=== Death ===
Zaramo people hold their dead with high respect and reverence. They believe that life is continued into death, in which the spirits of the dead, mizimu, only bring misfortune upon the living. Illness, death, infertility, and poor agriculture can all be attributed to the spitefulness of mizimu. Tambiko are funeral rites where the family clean the grave and offer food and drink to each other and the deceased. Sometimes a temporary hut is built around the grave to act as a shrine. After Tanzanian independence in the 1960s, an increasing number of Zaramo people have requested to be buried in their home villages on private land or on church grounds.

==== Grave markers ====
The influence of Islam and the increase of urbanization and literacy have been marked as responsible for the decline in traditional Zaramo figure grave posts. The majority of contemporary grave markers are slab markers with written sentiments and notifiers. Decreasing land availability in Dar Es Salaam has led to an increase in unmarked grave sites holding multiple bodies, which has resulted in a higher importance being placed upon sufficient grave marking.

Traditional Zaramo grave figures have a variety of names: mwana hiti (no longer in contemporary use,) nguzo za makaburi (translated to "grave posts,") mashahidi wa makaburi (translated to "grave witness.") These figures are considered witnesses or representation of the deceased. Mwana hiti grave figures are different from mwana hiti initiation figures, and were mainly used for the graves of headmen or chiefs. Sometimes grave markers were created as marionette-like, wooden puppets called mtoto wa bandia to become mnemonic honorary devices.

=== Prestige staffs ===
Staffs, aside from their use as walking supports, are used as ritual aids, titular symbols, and representations of power. Specific staffs are usual signifiers of chiefs, diviners, and linguists.

==== Kifimbo staffs ====
Literally translated to "small stick," kifimbo staffs are small staffs used mainly for military authority. It is either held in the hand or tucked between the upper arm and the torso. Kifimbo hold no functional use, and are considered purely symbolic.

==== Kome staffs ====
Traditional kome staffs are tall staffs made from blackwood (mpingo) and are carved to possess animal and human (women) decoration. Mwana hiti were common top decorations before Tanzanian independence. Kome staffs are typically associated with chief power, and so their decreased presence is directly correlated to that of chiefs in Tanzania.

== Pottery ==
=== Usage ===
By the early-mid-20th century, much of Zaramo pottery consisted of internal creations and imports from Europe, Japan, and India. Most of Zaramo pottery consists of ceramic water jars and earthenware cooking pots and dishes. Pottery is generally made for kitchen-use, thus resulting in two main types/uses: vessels for liquid (narrow-rimmed) and vessels for cooking and serving food (open and curved rims.)

Cooking dishes may range from 5-12 inches in diameter and 2-3 inches in height, usually topped with an open, flared rim. General cooking pots are called chungu, while dishes made specifically for the act of frying are called kaango or kikaango (depending on size), with smaller bowls being referred to as bakuli. Chetezo or Kitezo are shallow dishes made to be placed on shrine pedestals to hold incense offerings.

Mtungi are large pots, sometimes reaching 2 feet high, that are made particularly to hold water for bathing and drinking; a household generally has two of these vessels, one for each use. Sometimes mtungi are replaced with buckets or oil drums, the manufactured alternatives being more durable, though they keep the water less cool. Mtungi tend to have more fragile necks prone to cracking and chipping.

There is not much distinction between pottery for everyday use and pottery for rituals, such as ceremonial mwali bathing, healing rituals, and grave offerings. Everyday pottery may be used, though many ceremonies require the vessel to be new.

=== Process ===
The majority of potters in Zaramo culture are women, who are called fundi wa kufinyanga or "masters of making pottery." Pottery is seen as a job that complements the agricultural and domestic responsibilities assigned to women. Apart from most of Africa, Zaramo women do not sell their pottery in markets, instead operating on an order/commission system. While any women may choose to practice pottery, many women are taught by older relatives when they are mwali, a time when girls are secluded in the home and normally learn domestic skills. Pottery is a physically strenuous task, which is the main reason a woman may retire from the practice.

Good clay is the most essential part of Zaramo pottery, with many potters choosing to mix several types of clay to achieve maximum durability through the firing process. A pottery wheel is not used; instead, "pinch pot" techniques (generally for smaller vessels) and coiling methods (generally for larger vessels) are used. After being formed, the pottery are left to dry out for two to seven days before being fired, not in a kiln, but a wood fire. The vessels are placed on top of a fire, and more wood and plant material are placed on top of the vessels. Firing lasts two to three hours. If the pottery is to be colored, they are colored directly after firing.

=== Finish and ornamentation ===
The bodies of vessels are burnished using seeds, metal, stones or shells, while necks/rims are smoothed with leaves or paper.

Color is added directly after firing and mostly consists of reds and blacks. Red pigment is made from either the boiling of the mzingifuri plant (where the vessel is dipped into the pigment) or from the heating of kitahoymse grass seeds (which are turned into a solid mass that is then rubbed onto a just-fired vessel to transfer pigment.) Black pigment is made from powdering tree bark (usually mango tree bark) and mixing it with water or citrus juice.

Ornamentation of pottery is appreciated in Zaramo culture, but is not integral. Decoration is either incised (using millet stalks, bamboo, or shells) or painted on. Lids, or funiko, aren't incised, only painted. Biiki are comb-like tools made to create incised parallel lines. All incised decorations are called marembo or mapambo, but there are specific names for other patterns such as huku na huku (zig-zag,) mistari (vertical lines,) and ukumbuo (horizontal lines).

== Basketry ==
=== Usage ===
Basketry is a very common practice in Zaramo and Tanzanian culture and can be broken down into several types.

Pakacha are baskets that are made for only a day or two's use. They are made of fresh palm leaves and are often used to transport small amounts of items/wares, whether for travel or for the marketplace. They are disposable and are made by common people, not specialists. Tenga are larger sturdier versions of pakacha. They are made to carry heavy loads and are, therefore, made with bamboo instead of palm leaves. Ungo (food and winnowing trays) and kikota (small beer vessels) also use bamboo, though it is more tightly woven.

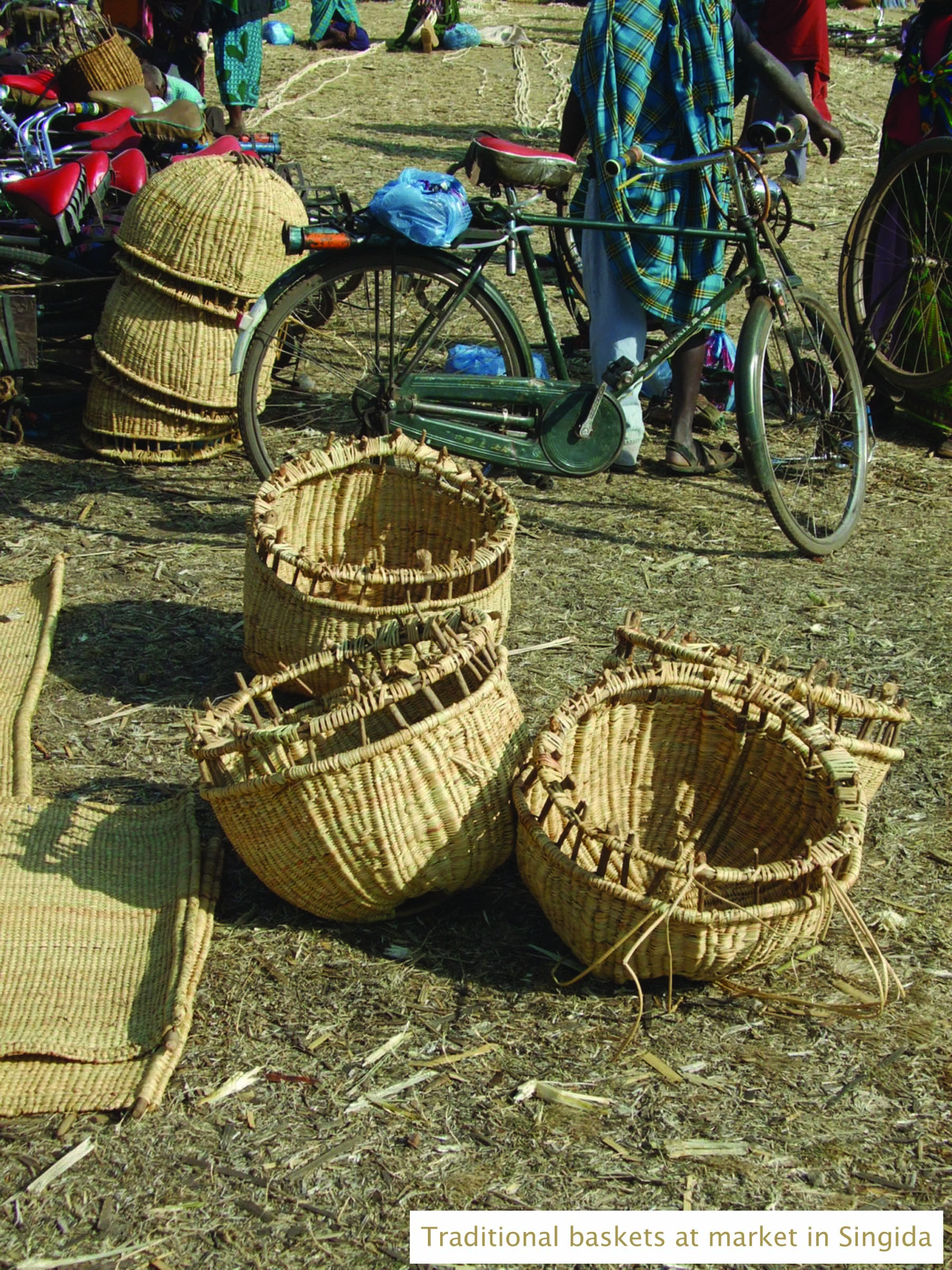
Baskets in a Singida marketplace

Kawa are decorated food covers made from wild date palms called mkindu. They are often decorated with Swahili proverbs, fruits, vegetables, and flowers. Similar to kawa are fans called vipepeo. Types of mats include mkeka (large rectangular mats for sitting,) msala (oval prayer mats,) jamvi (large, sturdy mats for porch covering,) vitanga (smaller, ovular versions of jamvi,) and kumba (matting for fences and walls.)

=== Process ===
Basketry is created using mainly bamboo, dwara palm leaves, and date palm leaves. The plant fibers are then put into plaits, of which there are many different types such as jicho la kuku for "eye of the chicken," pacha for "crossroads," and vinyota as "stars." Once the plant fibers are plaited into long strips, they are sewn together to create the desired basketry shape. Basketry used to be sewn together with coconut fibers, but today it is more common to use twine or plastic from bags. Many baskets are designated to be natural in color, though some are dyed. Dying of baskets, if done, is usually in black or red-orange made from roots of the mdaa plant or berries of the mzingefuri respectively. The only tools needed are a paring knife and a needle or an awl.

While anyone can learn to make basketry, it is usually taught through family. Basketry-makers are called fundi kusuka, "masters of plaiting." Basketry, like pottery, is considered a part-time job only. It is typical for men to handle weaving that uses bamboo and for women to do the weaving that uses palm leaves. Men usually perform the decorating.

== Notable people of Zaramo heritage ==
- Kimbamanduka (fl. 19th century), Tanzanian elephant hunter, warrior, pazi (chief) of the Zaramo people
