= Ramani Huria =

Tanzanian mapping project

Ramani Huria is community-based mapping project in Dar Es Salaam, Tanzania, training university students and local community members to create highly accurate maps of the most flood-prone areas of the city using OpenStreetMap.

== About ==
The city of Dar es Salaam is on the coast of Tanzania and in the rainy season is vulnerable to large scale flooding. Additionally, there are no current or reliable maps which can be used by aid respondents in the event of flooding. Maps are created specifically in flood prone wards with the aim of providing information for flood resistance. The current population of Dar es Salaam is estimated at over 6 million with a current annual population growth of 5.7%, resulting in 70% of the city being of informal settlements. Ramani Huria is putting these informal settlements on the map, along with drainage systems, roads, building features, and district boundaries.

Ramani Huria 1.0 began in 2015, with the second phase, Ramani Huria 2.0 beginning in July 2017. In the first six months of Ramani Huria 2.0, over 51,000 buildings were mapped, and over 2000 community surveys were conducted.

The project uses a number of mapping tools including OpenStreetMap, InaSAFE, drone imagery, OpenMapKit and OpenDataKit.

== Community flood mapping ==
Ramani Huria trains university students and local community members in mapping tools to create highly accurate maps which is open and accessible to everyone. To achieve this, the Ramani Huria team works closely with community members throughout the data collection process. Community members are trained on free, open source smartphone applications, such as OpenMapKit and Open Data Kit, to use for data collection. The team check the GPS accuracy of the smartphones and provide internet scratchcards to guarantee good connectivity. Supported by the Ramani Huria team, community members collect data on their phones from individual households whilst accompanied by the Community Leader ("Mjumbe" in Swahili) for that area. Survey questions measure the history, impact and cause of flooding in that area. All data collected by the Ramani is free and accessible for anyone to use on OpenStreetMap

== Infrastructure and highway mapping ==
Ramani Huria uses ODK to collect information on the highways. This includes records of formal and informal street names.

Two teams coordinate to collect and verify the data. The first team uses ODK forms to send collected forms to the server, and the second team undertakes data cleaning and uploads the clean data to OpenStreetMap.

== Drainage mapping ==
Ramani Huria has completed field mapping, quality checks, and data cleaning for the drainage systems in twelve wards of Dar es Salaam. Quality checks are conducted using the Deltares Hydro-OSM tool, a toolbox to convert OpenStreetMap data into data layers that can be used for hydrological and hydraulic modelling.

== Areas mapped ==
A work-in-progress atlas of the 450 Sub-Wards in the city has been developed which is intended for community resilience planning. The following wards of Dar es Salaam have been mapped and data is available both through OpenStreetMap and the Ramani Huria website.

- Kinondoni
  - Hananasif
  - Mabibo
  - Magomeni
  - Makumbusho
  - Makurumla
  - Mburahati
  - Msasani
  - Mwananyamala
  - Ndugumbi
  - Tandale
- Ilala
  - Buguruni
  - Mchikichini
- Temeke
  - Keko

== Partners ==
The project works with a number of partners to conduct mapping and utilise the maps created. Partners include: Tanzania Commission for Science and Technology; The University of Dar es Salaam; Ardhi University; Sokoine University of Agriculture; The City of Dar es Salaam; Buni; The World Bank; The Global Facility for Disaster Reduction and Recovery (GFDRR), Data Zetu; and Humanitarian OpenStreetMap Team.
