= Singeli =

Tanzanian music genre

- Stylistic origins: Ngoma music; Taarab; Muziki wa dansi; Bongo Flava
- Cultural origins: Mid-2000s Tandale, Dar es Salaam
- Typical instruments: Ngoma; Bass; Synthesizer

Subgenres
- Mnanda; Mchiriku; Mdundiko

Other topics
- Unyago; Bemba; Mdundiko; Kidumbaki

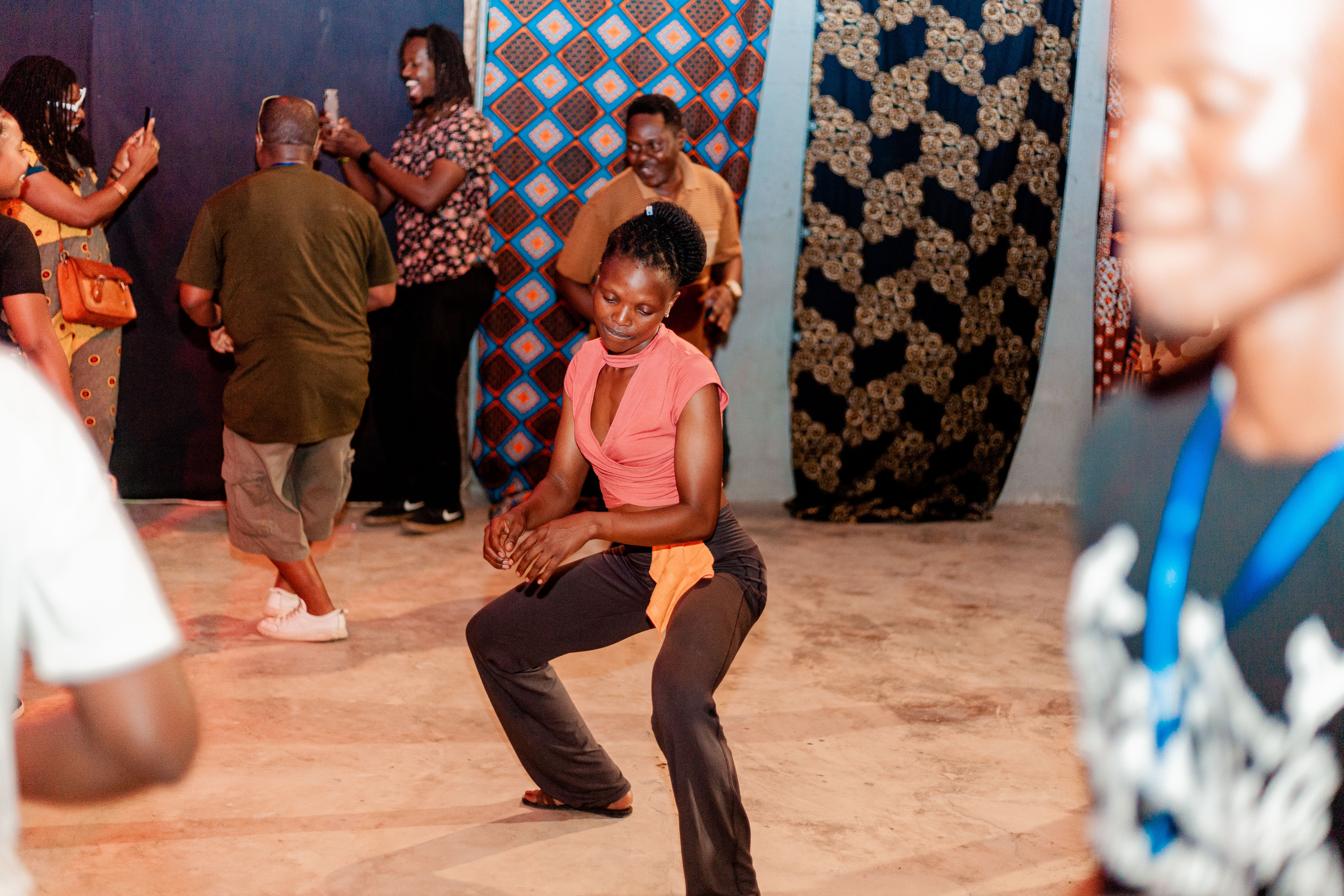
Singeli in Tanzania

Singeli or sometimes called Sengeli is a Tanzanian music genre that originated with the Zaramo in the Mtogole neighborhood of the Tandale ward in Kinondoni District of Dar es Salaam Region around the mid-2000s. The genre has since the late 2010s spread throughout Tanzania, and since 2020 the surrounding Great Lakes. Singeli is a ngoma music and dance where an MC performs over fast tempo taarab music, often at between 200 and 300 beats per minute (BPM), while women dance. Male and female MCs are near equally common, however styles between MC gender typically differ significantly. Male MCs usually perform in fast-paced rap, while female MCs usually perform kwaya.

In the early 2000s vigodoro, meaning all night parties, began being organized by Zaramo women for their other female family and friends particularly Manzese and Tandale wards. However the latter is considered the birthplace of the genre. The parties involved playing cassette tapes of taarab music that other women would come and dance to. As vigodoro parties grew MCs would be invited to come and perform over the cassettes. Msaga Sumu was one such MC and is considered one of the early founders of Singeli.
