= Kijitonyama =

Ward of Kinondoni District, Dar es Salaam Region

Kijitonyama Kata ya Kijitonyama (Swahili)
- Ward of Kinondoni District
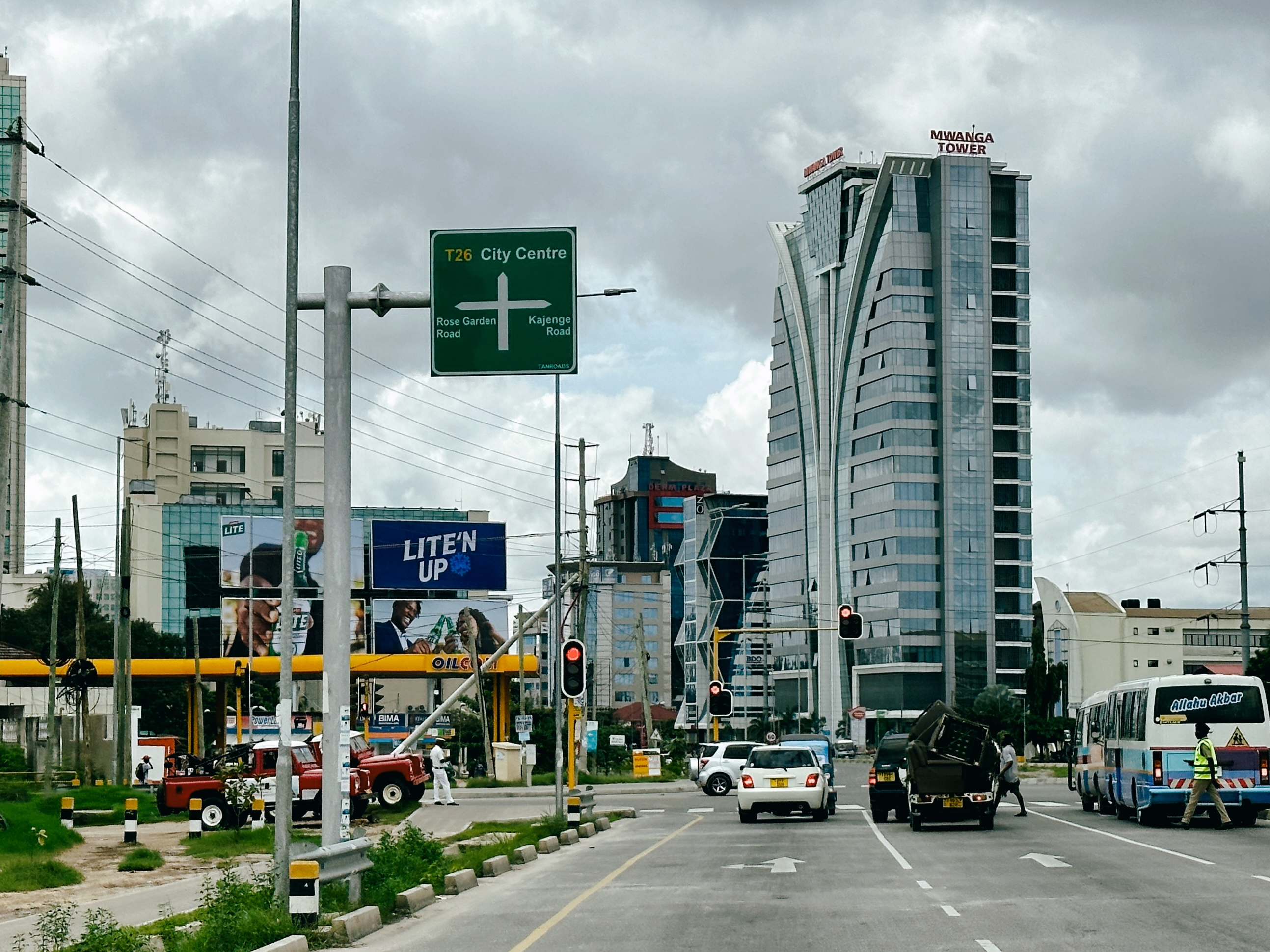
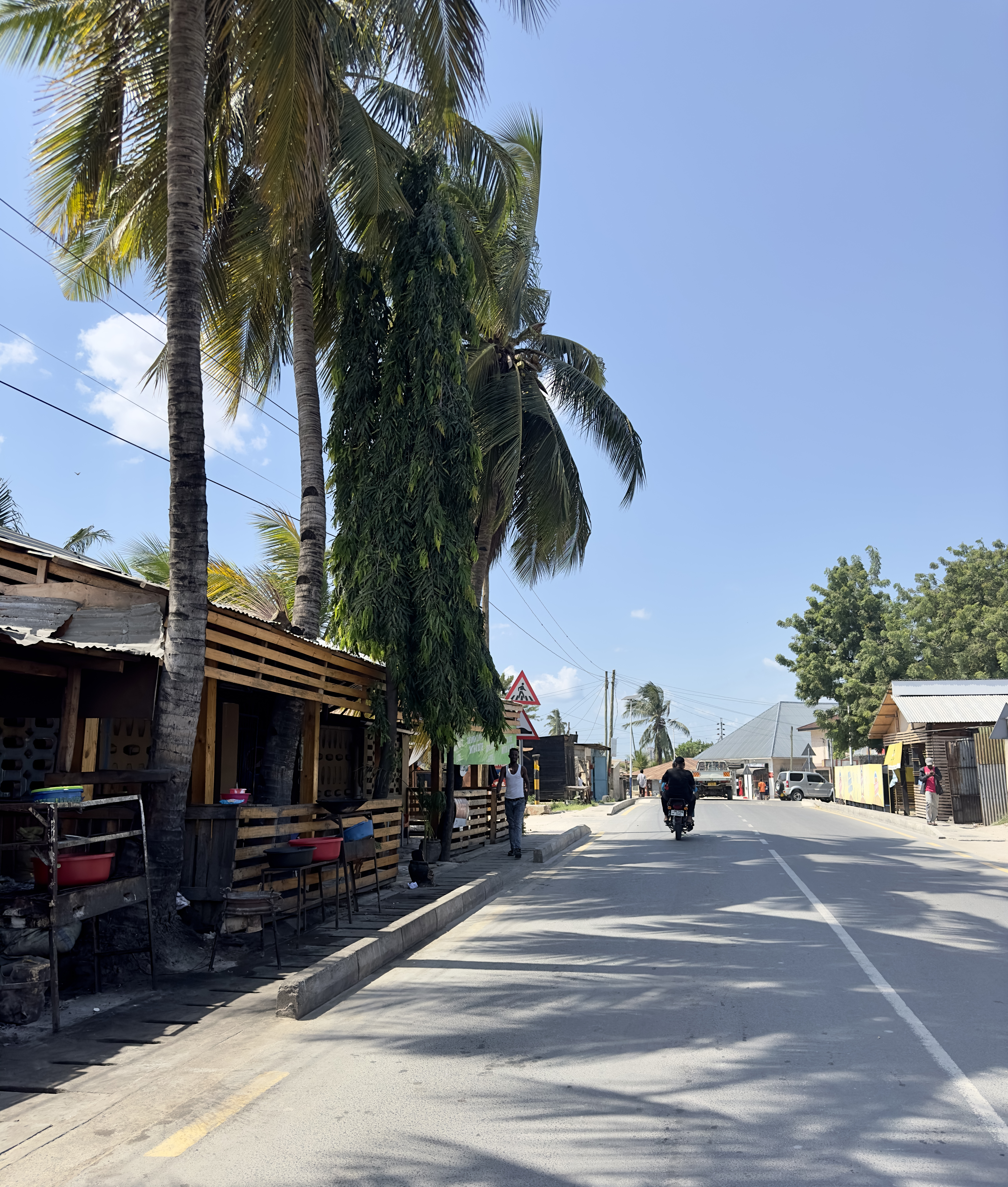
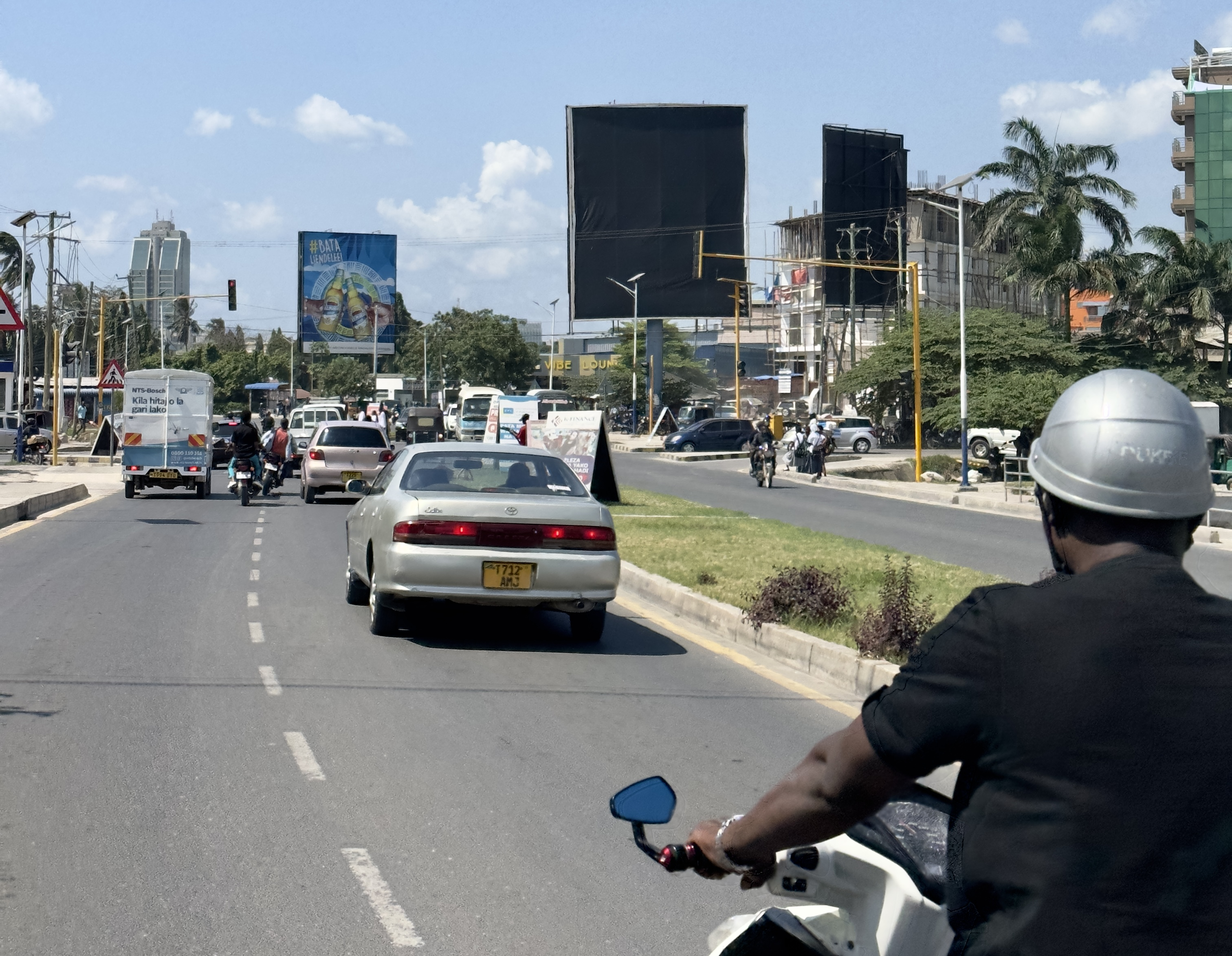
- From top to bottom: Mwanga Tower in Kijitonyama, Street scene in Kijitonyama & Shekilango Ave going through Kijitonyama ward
- Interactive map of Kijitonyama
- Coordinates: 6°46′27.48″S 39°14′0.24″E
- Country: Tanzania
- Region: Dar es Salaam Region
- District: Kinondoni District

Area
  - Total: 3.9 km^{2} (1.5 sq mi)

Population (2012)
  - Total: 58,132

Ethnic groups
  - Settler: Swahili
  - Ancestral: Zaramo
- Tanzanian Postal Code: 14113

Kijitonyama (Kata ya Kijitonyama, in Swahili) is an administrative ward in Kinondoni District of the Dar es Salaam Region in Tanzania. The ward is surrounded on its northern side by the wards of Makumbusho, Mwananyamala, and Hananasif. The ward is bordered to the east by the Ilala MC wards of Upanga West and Mchikichini. Wards Mzimuni and Ndugumbi form the southern and western borders. According to the 2012 census, the ward has a population of 58,132.

== Administration ==
The postal code for Kijitonyama ward is 14113. The ward is divided into the following neighborhoods (Mitaa):

- Aliamua "A"
- Aliamua "B"
- Bwawani, Kijitonyama
- Kijitonyama, Kijitonyama

- Mpakani "A"
- Mpakani "B"
- Mwenge
- Nzasa

=== Government ===
The ward, like every other ward in the country, has local government offices based on the population served. The Kijitonyama Ward administration building houses a court as per the Ward Tribunal Act of 1988, including other vital departments for the administration the ward. The ward has the following administration offices:

- Kijitonyama Police Station
- Kijitonyama Government Office (Afisa Mtendaji)
- Kijitonyama Tribunal (Baraza La Kata) is a Department inside Ward Government Office

In the local government system of Tanzania, the ward is the smallest democratic unit. Each ward is composed of a committee of eight elected council members which include a chairperson, one salaried officer (with no voting rights), and an executive officer. One-third of seats are reserved for women councillors.

== Demographics ==
The Zaramo people lived in the ward and a major portion of the district at one time. As the city progressed, the ward transformed into an international neighborhood. There are 58,132 people living in the ward.

== Education and health ==
=== Education ===
The ward is home to these educational institutions:

- Kijtonyama Kisiwani Primary School
- Shekilango Primary School
- Mwenge Primary School
- Mapambano Primary School
- Kijitonyama Secondary School
- British School, Kijitonyama
- Zuhura Islamic Secondary School
- Masjid Qubah Secondary School
- Kenton High School, Kijitonyama

=== Healthcare ===
The ward is home to the following health institutions:

- Kijitonyama Dispensary
- Healthrite Dispensary
- Mwenge Dispensary
- Sadarya Medical Center
- Marie Stopes, Mwenge Hospital
- Royal Green Cross Health Center
- TMH Healthcare Center
- Edward Michaudi Health Center
