= Maulid ally Mtulia =

Tanzanian politician

Honourable Maulid Ally Mtulia MP

Legislature
- Incumbent
- Assumed office December 2015
- Preceded by: Iddi Azan

Member of Parliament for Kinondoni West
- Preceded by: Iddi Azan

Personal details
- Party: CCM
- Education: University of Dar es Salaam

Maulid Ally Mtulia (born 7 January 1986) is a Tanzanian CCM politician and Member of Parliament for Kinondoni Constituency since 2015.
