= Henry Nkumbe =

Cameroonian ophthalmologist

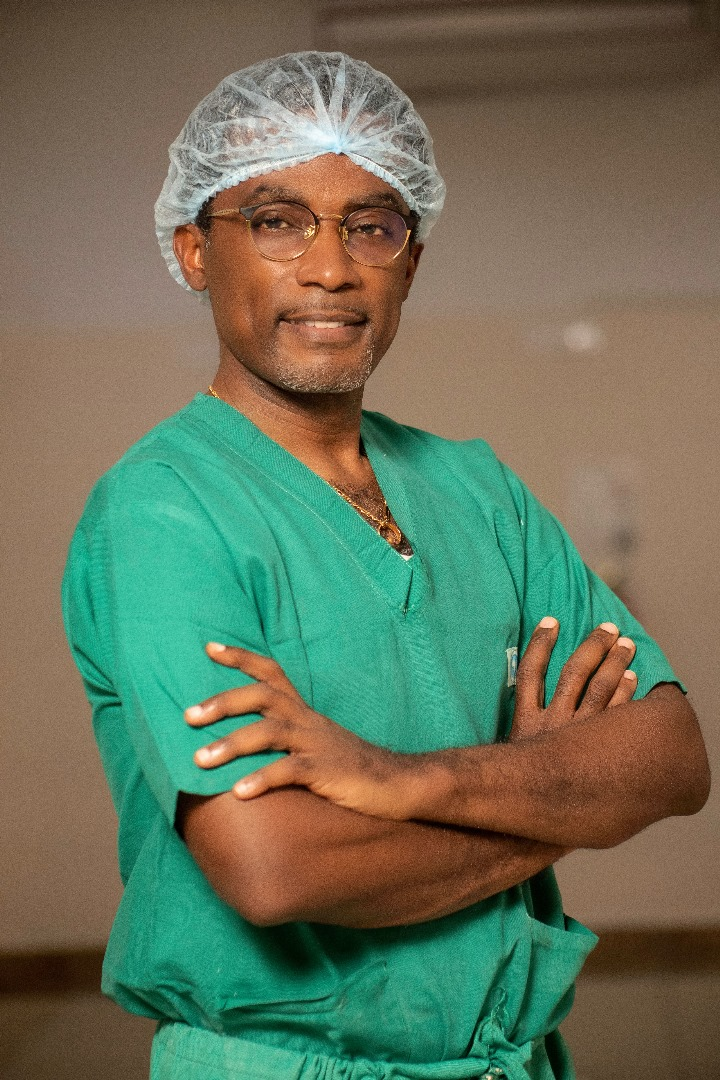
Image of Dr Henry Nkumbe

Henry Ebong Nkumbe is a Cameroonian ophthalmologist. specialized in vitreo-retinal surgery, cataract surgery, and refractive surgery. He is also a public health ophthalmology professional and ophthalmological hospital management expert.

== Birth and academic background ==
Nkumbe was born on 26 June 1971, in Kumba, in the South-West region of Cameroon. He pursued his medical studies in Switzerland and Germany.

== Career ==
In 2002, he joined the World Health Organization (WHO) in Geneva and its special program for research and training on tropical diseases. In 2004, he became part of the international organization for people with disabilities, CBM In September 2006, he worked in Madagascar as a medical advisor in collaboration with the Ministry of Health of Madagascar and the Malagasy Ophthalmological Society. During his time in Madagascar, he served as a visiting professor in the community eye health program at Groote Schur Hospital in Cape Town. He was also a visiting consultant at Kilimanjaro Christian Medical Center at Tumaini University in Moshi, Tanzania.

Since 2013, he has been leading the Magrabi ICO Cameroon Eye Institute whose aim is to fight against blindness through cataract and glaucoma operations. The hospital benefits from the support of the American government through the American public agency, Overseas Private Investment Corporation (OPIC).

== Authorship ==
Nkumbe has authored several scientific publications in the field of ophthalmology.

== Awards and recognition ==
- Knight of the Cameroon Order of Valour, by the President of the Republic of Cameroon in 2022.
- Best of Africa Award, United Kingdom in 2020.
- Jean and Jacques Chibret Prize, Paris, France in 2019.
- Knight of the National Order of Merit of the Republic of Madagascar, conferred by the President of Madagascar in 2012.
- Recipient of the International Council of Ophthalmology's Helmerich RRF International Fellowship in 2011.
