= Manzese =

Ward of Ubungo District, Dar es Salaam Region

Manzese Kata ya Manzese (Swahili)
- Ward of Ubungo District
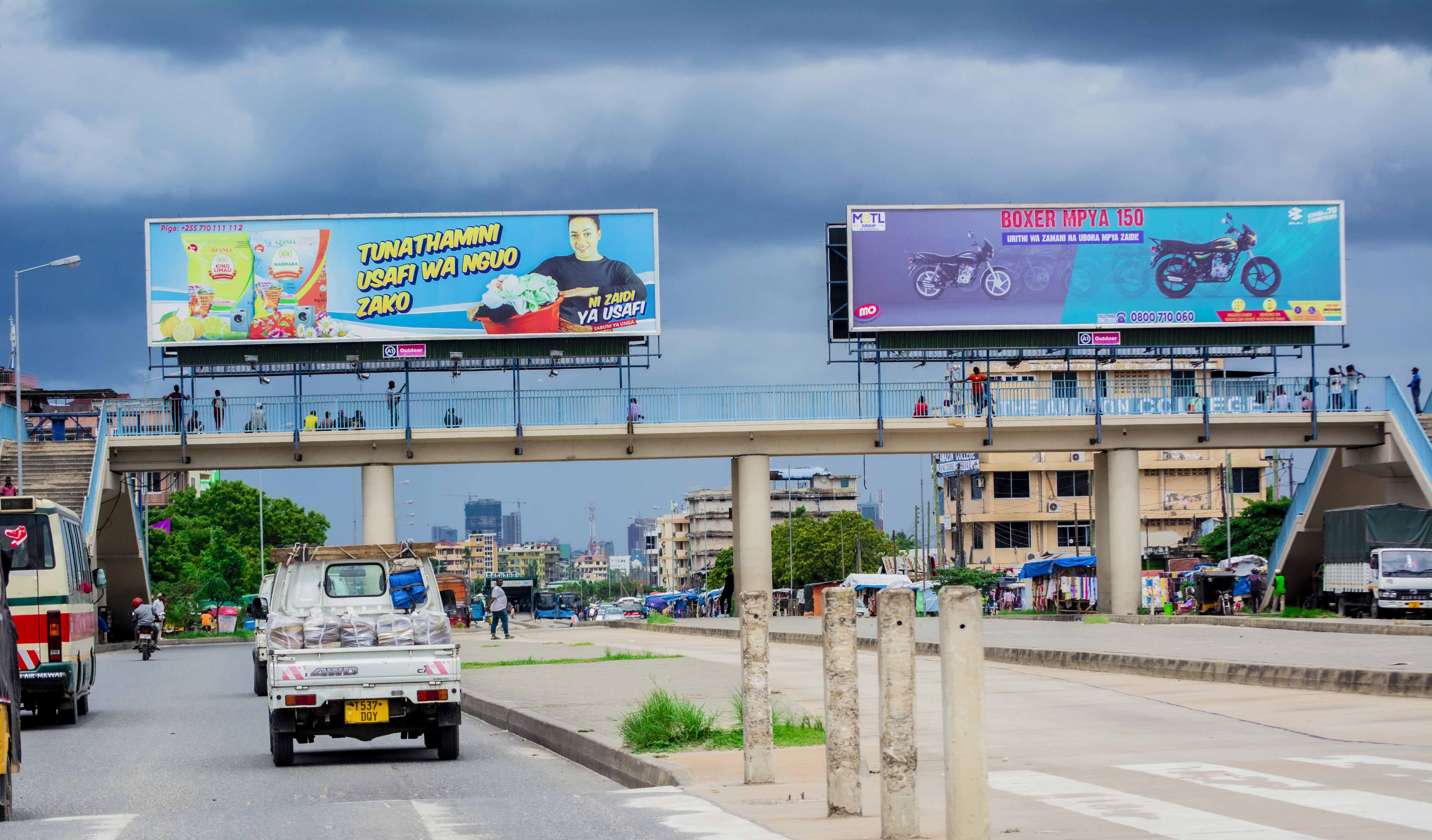
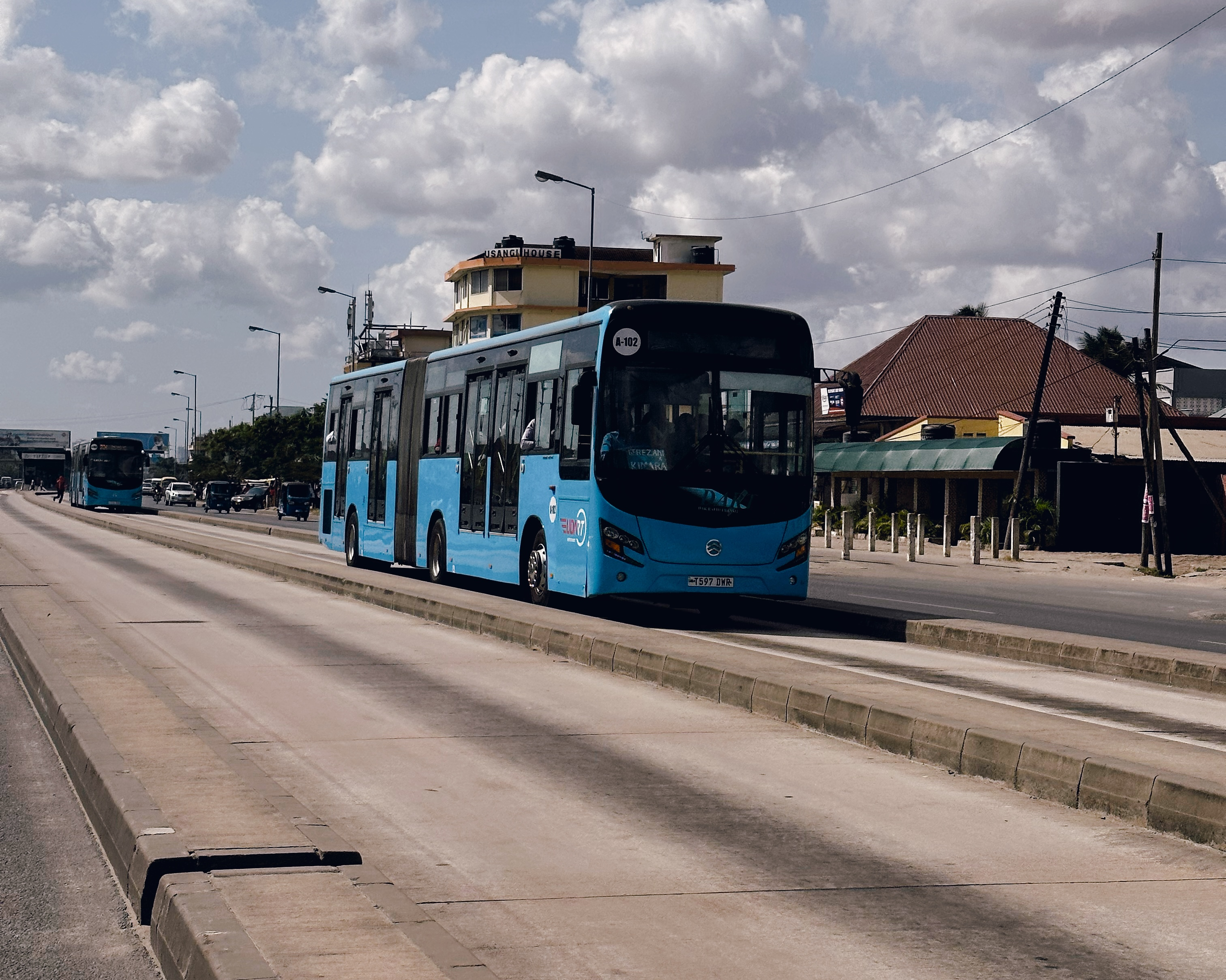
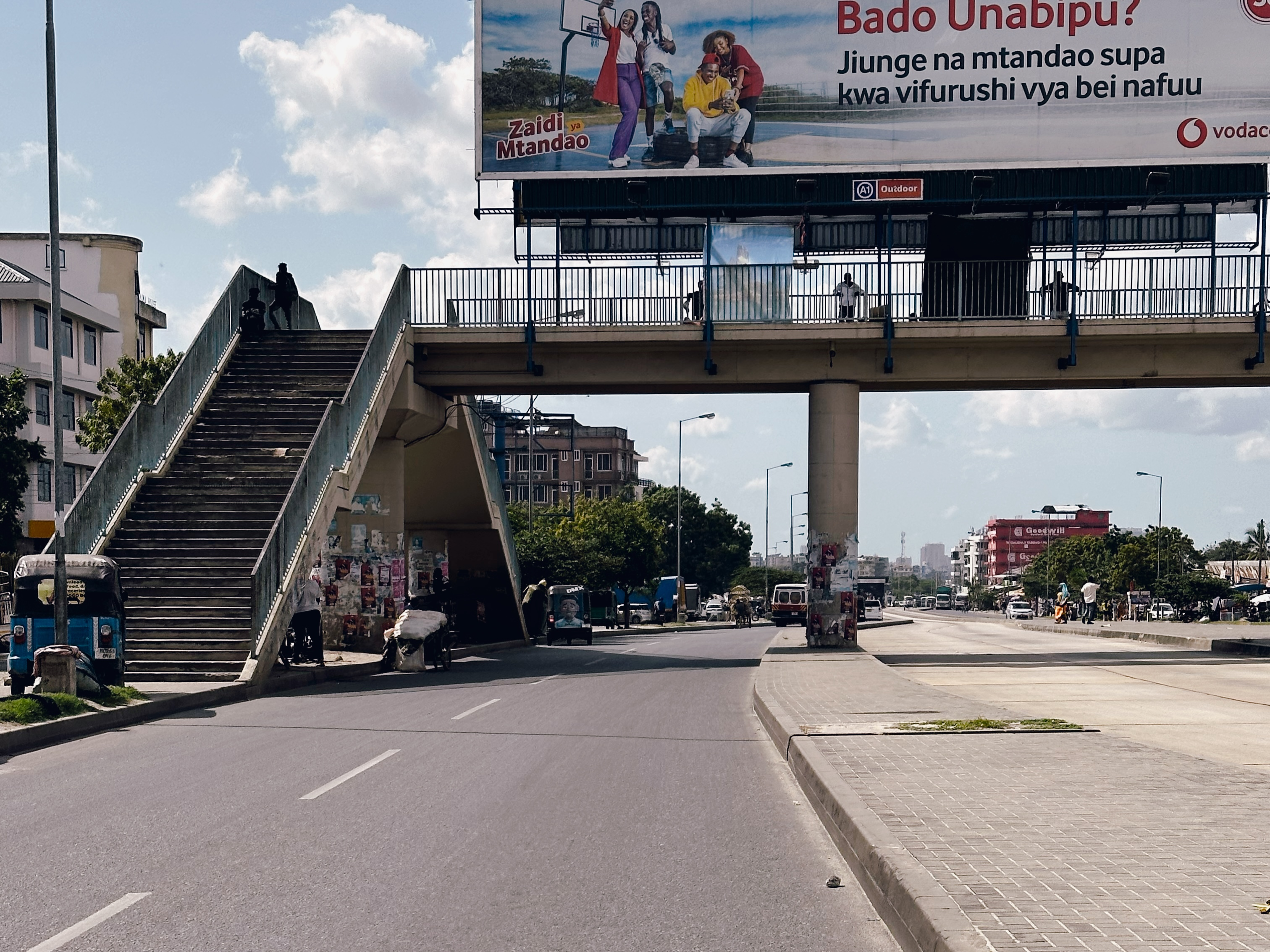
- From top to bottom: Manzese pedestrian bridge, UDART in Manzese & steps of Manzese bridge
- Interactive map of Manzese
- Coordinates: 6°47′49.56″S 39°14′1.32″E
- Country: Tanzania
- Region: Dar es Salaam Region
- District: Ubungo District

Area
  - Total: 1.8 km^{2} (0.69 sq mi)

Population (2012)
  - Total: 70,507

Ethnic groups
  - Settler: Swahili
  - Ancestral: Zaramo
- Tanzanian Postal Code: 16108

Manzese (Kata ya Manzese, in Swahili) is an administrative ward in Ubungo District of the Dar es Salaam Region in Tanzania. Sinza and Kijitonyama, the latter belonging to Kinondoni MC, border the ward on the north. The ward is bordered to the east by the wards of Tandale, Ndugumbi, and Makurumla. Mabibo is in the south. Ubungo ward is to the west. Manzese was founded as a squatted informal settlement and had a population of 90,000 in 1975. A third of its adults were working full-time. By 1980, it had basic infrastructure such as roads and sanitation facilities. According to the 2012 census, the ward has a total population of 70,507.

== Administration ==
The postal code for Manzese Ward is 16108. The ward is divided into the following neighborhoods (Mitaa):

- Chakula Bora
- Kilimani, Manzese
- Mferejini
- Midizini
- Mnazi Mmoja
- Muungano, Manzese
- Mvuleni
- Mwembeni
- Tupendane
- Uzuri

=== Government ===
Like every other ward in the country, the ward has local government offices based on the population served. The Manzese Ward administration building houses a court as per the Ward Tribunal Act of 1988, including other vital departments for the administration of the ward. The ward has the following administration offices:

- Manzese Ward Police Station
- Manzese Ward Government Office (Afisa Mtendaji)
- Manzese Ward Tribunal (Baraza La Kata) is a Department inside Ward Government Office

In the local government system of Tanzania, the ward is the smallest democratic unit. Each ward comprises a committee of eight elected council members, including a chairperson, one salaried officer (with no voting rights), and an executive officer. One-third of seats are reserved for women councilors.

== Demographics ==
The ward serves as the Zaramo's ancestral home along with a sizable chunk of the district. The ward changed over time into a cosmopolitan ward as the city grew.

== Education and health ==
=== Education ===
The ward is home to these educational institutions:

- Manzese Primary School
- Manzese Secondary School

=== Healthcare ===
The ward is home to the following health institutions:

- Manzese Health Center
- Marise Health Center
- Tip Top Health Center
- St. Monica Health Center
