= Mikocheni =

Ward of Kinondoni District, Dar es Salaam Region

Mikocheni Kata ya Mikocheni (Swahili)
- Ward of Kinondoni District
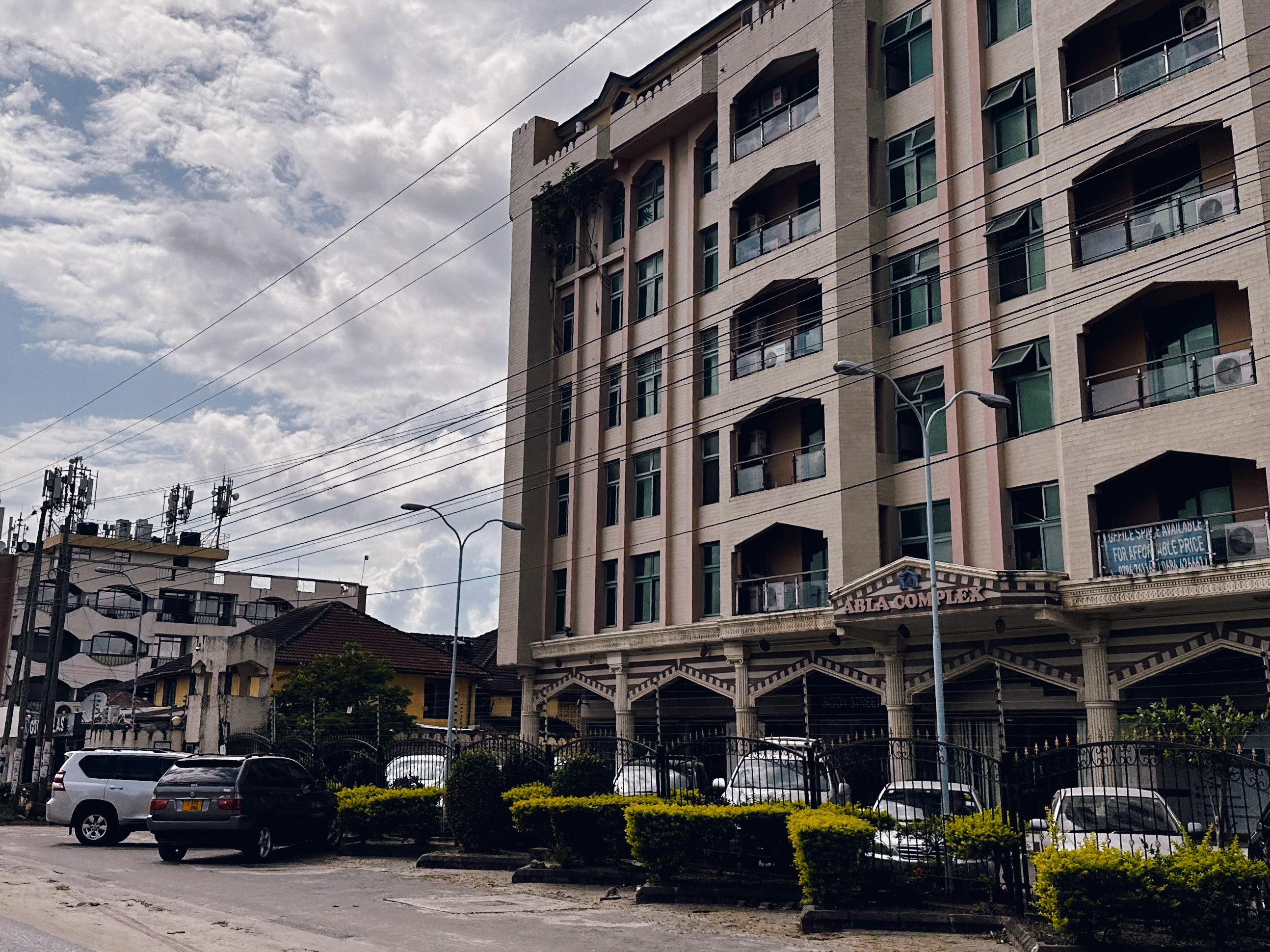
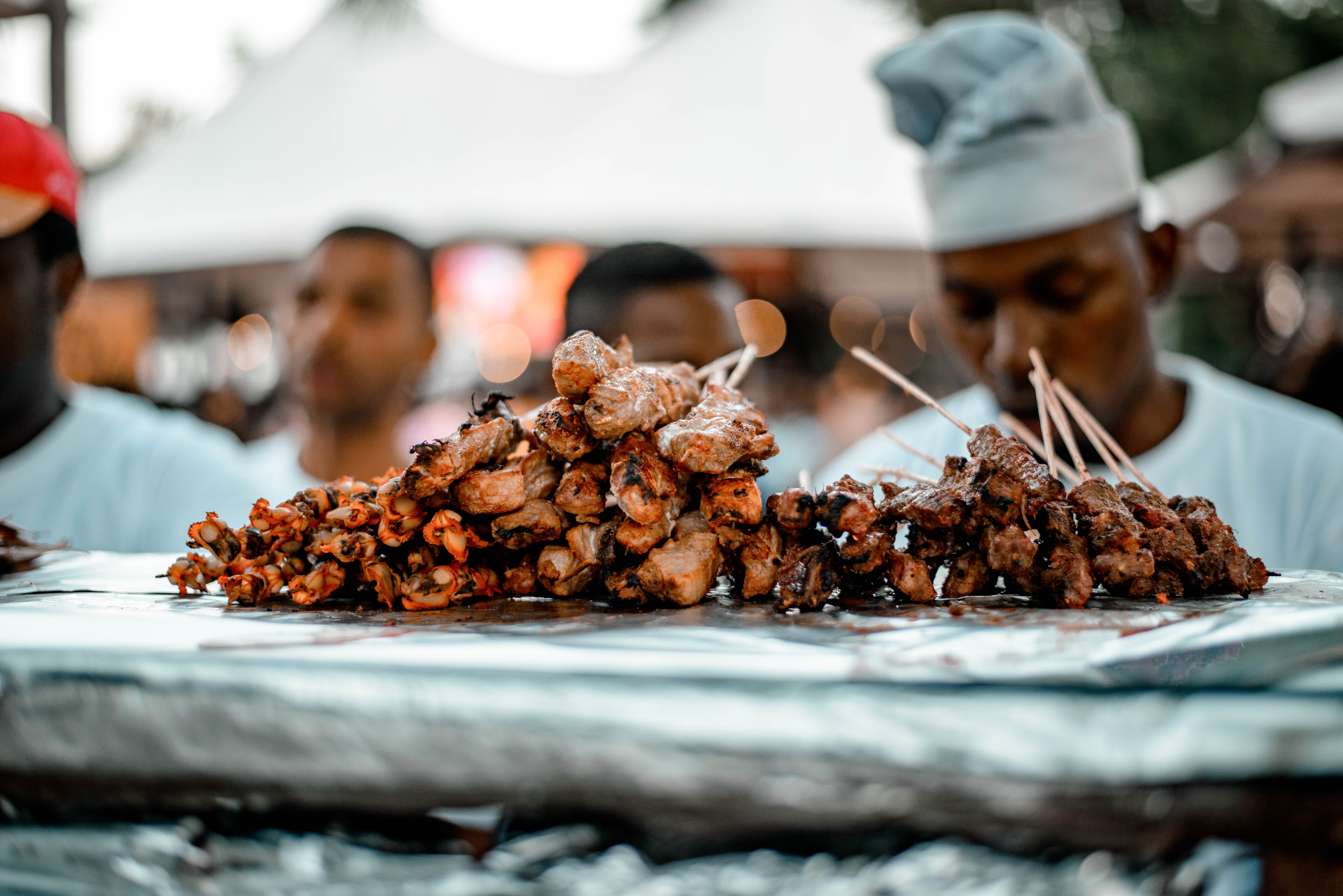
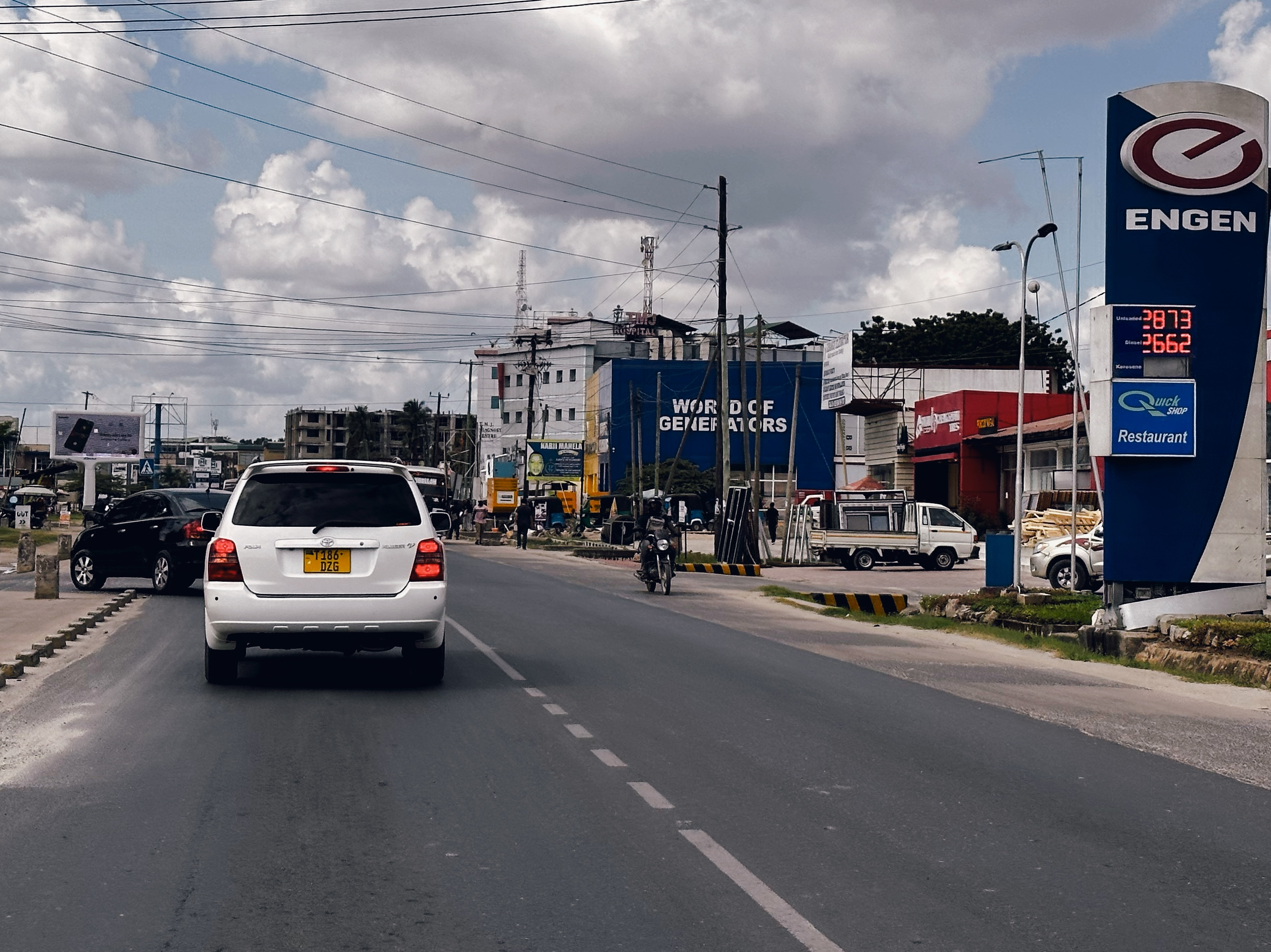
- From top to bottom: Buildings in Mikocheni, Mishkaki (beef kebabs) in Mikocheni & Streetscene in Mikocheni
- Interactive map of Mikocheni
- Coordinates: 6°45′43.2″S 39°14′30.48″E
- Country: Tanzania
- Region: Dar es Salaam Region
- District: Kinondoni District

Area
  - Total: 7.5 km^{2} (2.9 sq mi)

Population (2012)
  - Total: 32,947

Ethnic groups
  - Settler: Swahili
  - Ancestral: Zaramo
- Tanzanian Postal Code: 14112

Mikocheni (Kata ya Mikocheni, in Swahili) is an administrative ward in Kinondoni District of the Dar es Salaam Region in Tanzania. The Kawe and Msasani form the north and east boundaries of the ward, respectively. The ward is bordered to the south by the Kinondoni and Mwananyamala. And last but not least, Makongo to west of the ward. Many government organizations, notably the Tanzania Communications Regulatory Authority, have their headquarters in the ward. According to the 2012 census, the ward has a population of 32,947.

== Administration ==
The postal code for Mikocheni ward is 14112. The ward is divided into the following neighborhoods (Mitaa):

- Ally H. Mwinyi
- Darajani
- Mikocheni "A"

- Mikocheni "B"
- Regent Estate
- TPDC

=== Government ===
The ward, like every other ward in the country, has local government offices based on the population served. The Mikocheni Ward administration building houses a court as per the Ward Tribunal Act of 1988, including other vital departments for the administration the ward. The ward has the following administration offices:

- Mikocheni Ward Police Station
- Mikocheni Ward Government Office (Afisa Mtendaji)
- Mikocheni Ward Tribunal (Baraza La Kata) is a Department inside Ward Government Office

In the local government system of Tanzania, the ward is the smallest democratic unit. Each ward is composed of a committee of eight elected council members which include a chairperson, one salaried officer (with no voting rights), and an executive officer. One-third of seats are reserved for women councillors.

== Demographics ==
The Zaramo people lived in the ward and a major portion of the district at one time. As the city progressed, the ward transformed into an international neighborhood. There are 32,947 people living in the ward.

== Attractions ==
Mikocheni houses the Makumbusho Village Museum (or simply Village Museum; in Swahili "Kijiji cha Makumbusho"), an outdoor museum exhibiting 16 traditional houses of the main ethnic groups of Tanzania, and the typical crops of each of these ethnic groups. Founded in 1996, it is one of a consortium of five museums collectively known as the National Museum of Tanzania. The museum is also associated with a cultural center (Makumbusho Cultural Centre), which organizes performances of traditional dances and traditional food tastings Tanzania. Local artists operate in the museum, and artisans display and sell their creations.

== Education and health ==
=== Education ===
The ward is home to these educational institutions:

- Mikocheni Primary School
- St. Florence Primary School
- Kwanza Primary School
- Sunrise Primary School
- Mikocheni Primary School
- Cordoba Girls Secondary School
- Hubert Kairuki Memorial University
- Mikocheni Agricultural Research Institute
- Tumaini University Dar es Salaam College

=== Healthcare ===
The ward is home to the following health institutions:

- Mikocheni "B" Dispensary
- Alpha Dispensary
- Dr.Kana Clinic
- Sanitas Health Center, Mikocheni
- JS Barbra Health Center
- Kairuki Hospital
- Mikocheni Hospital
- TMJ Hospital, Mikocheni
