= Tandale =

Ward of Kinondoni District, Dar es Salaam Region

Tandale Kata ya Tandale (Swahili)
- Ward of Kinondoni District
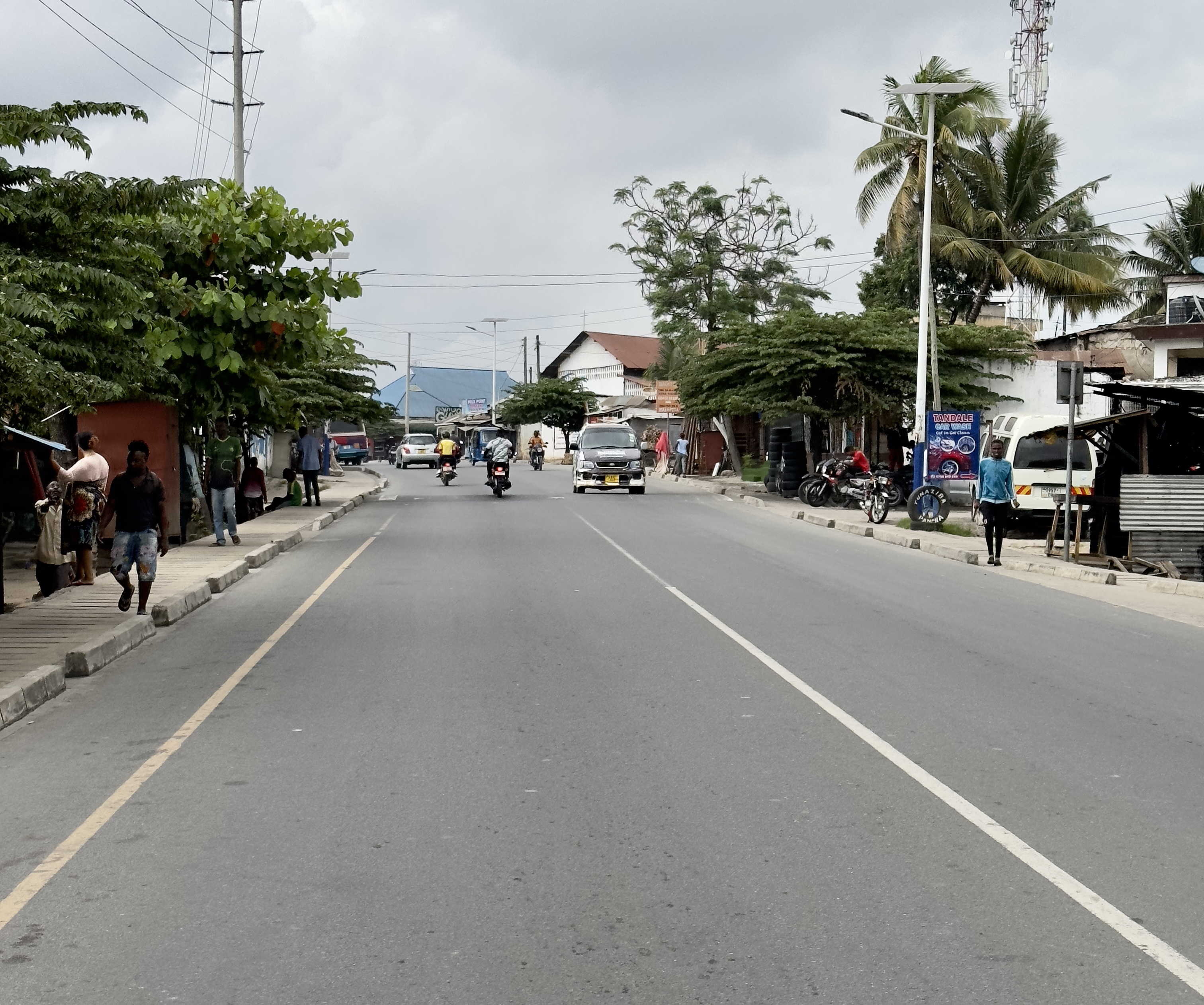
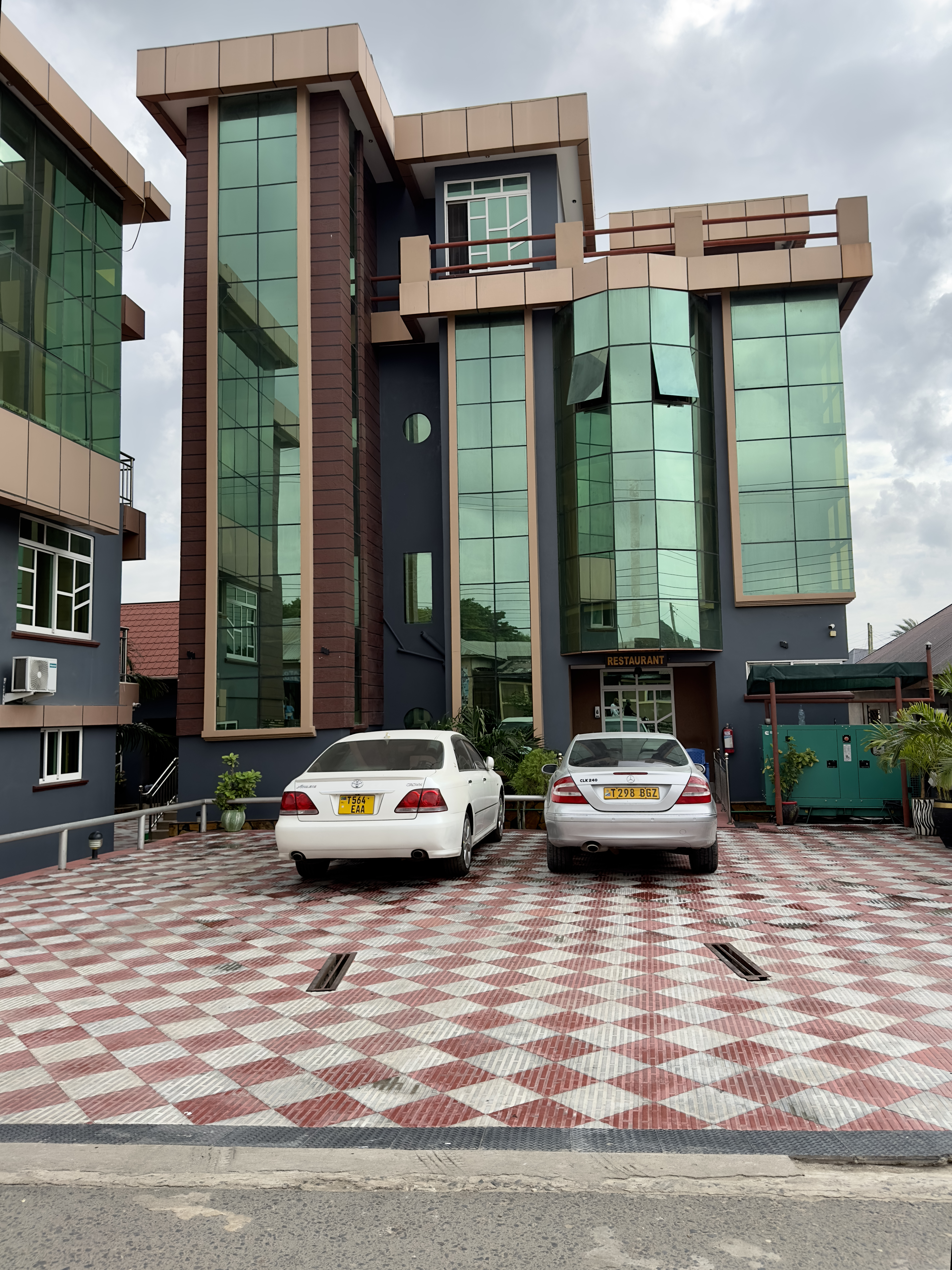
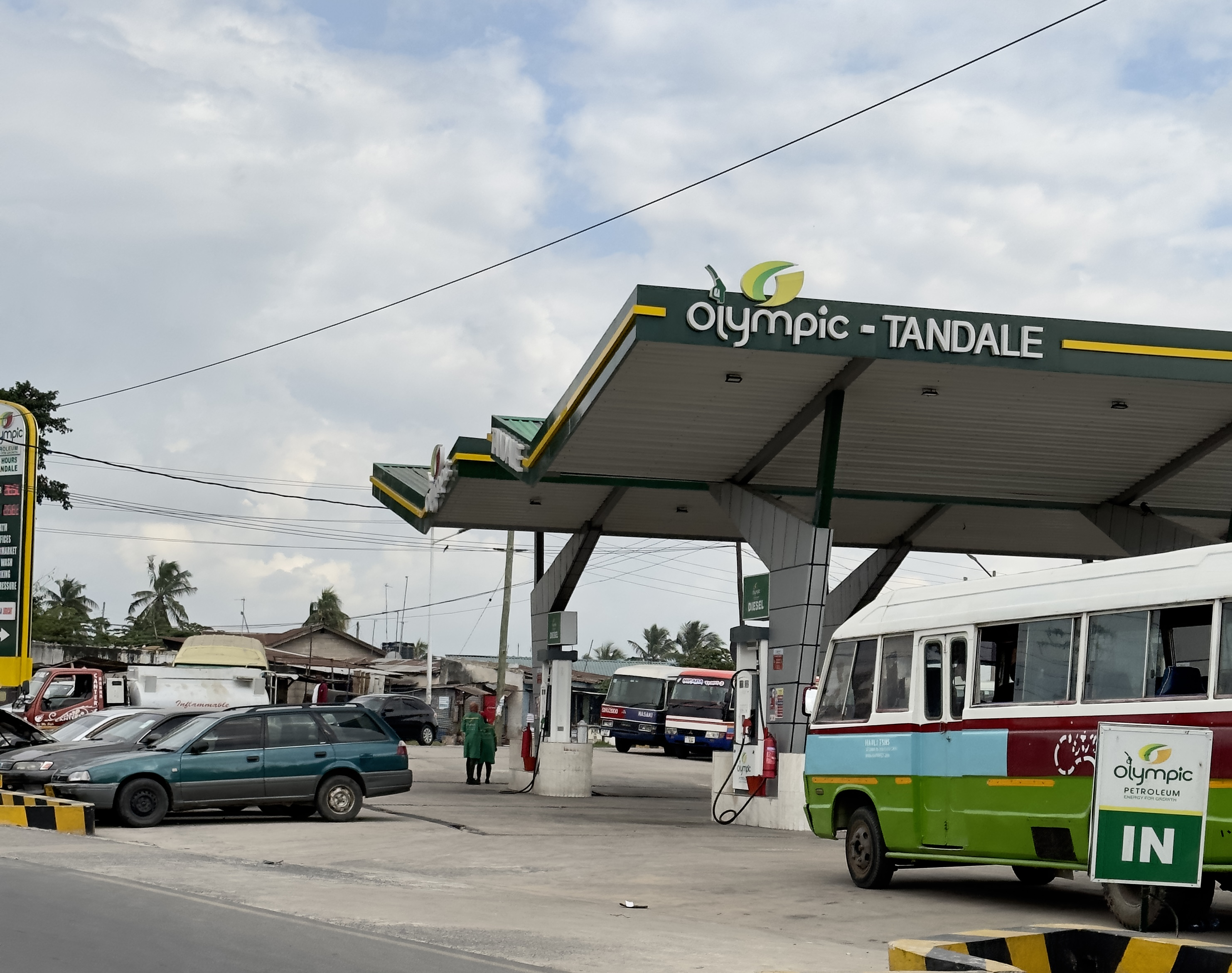
- From top to bottom: Rd in Tandale ward, Kinondoni MC, Hotel in Tandale & gas station in Tandale
- Interactive map of Tandale
- Coordinates: 6°47′37.32″S 39°14′30.12″E
- Country: Tanzania
- Region: Dar es Salaam Region
- District: Kinondoni District

Area
  - Total: 1.1 km^{2} (0.42 sq mi)

Population (2012)
  - Total: 54,781

Ethnic groups
  - Settler: Swahili
  - Ancestral: Zaramo
- Tanzanian Postal Code: 14106

Tandale (Kata ya Tandale, in Swahili) is an administrative ward in Kinondoni District of the Dar es Salaam Region in Tanzania. The ward is bordered by the wards of Makumbusho to the east, Ndugumbi to the south, Kijitonyama to the north, and Manzese to the west in the Ubungo MC. Tandale is considered the birthplace of Singeli music, specifically by the Zaramo community in the Mtogole neighborhood of the ward. According to the 2012 census, the ward has a population of 54,781.

== Administration ==
The postal code for Tandale ward is 14106. The ward is divided into the following neighborhoods (Mitaa):

- Kwa Tumbo
- Mkunduge
- Mtongole

- Muhaltani
- Pakacha
- Sokoni, Tandale

=== Government ===
The ward, like every other ward in the country, has local government offices based on the population served. The Tandale Ward administration building houses a court as per the Ward Tribunal Act of 1988, including other vital departments for the administration the ward. The ward has the following administration offices:

- Tandale Ward Police Station
- Tandale Ward Government Office (Afisa Mtendaji)
- Tandale Ward Tribunal (Baraza La Kata) is a Department inside Ward Government Office

In the local government system of Tanzania, the ward is the smallest democratic unit. Each ward is composed of a committee of eight elected council members which include a chairperson, one salaried officer (with no voting rights), and an executive officer. One-third of seats are reserved for women councillors.

== Demographics ==
The ward and a sizable part of the district were originally home to the Zaramo people. The ward evolved into an international community as the city grew. The ward was the most densely populated one in the nation as of 2012 with 54,781 residents.

== Education and health ==
=== Education ===
The ward is home to these educational institutions:

- Tandale Primary School
- Hekima Primary School

=== Healthcare ===
The ward is home to the following health institutions:

- Tandale Health Center
- One way Health Center
