= Makumbusho =

Ward of Kinondoni District, Dar es Salaam Region

Makumbusho Kata ya Makubusho (Swahili)
- Ward of Kinondoni District
- From top to bottom
- Interactive map of Makumbusho
- Coordinates: 6°47′25.8″S 39°15′2.52″E
- Country: Tanzania
- Region: Dar es Salaam Region
- District: Kinondoni District

Area
  - Total: 1.7 km^{2} (0.66 sq mi)

Population (2012)
  - Total: 68,093

Ethnic groups
  - Settler: Swahili
  - Ancestral: Zaramo
- Tanzanian Postal Code: 14107

Makumbusho (Kata ya Makumbusho, in Swahili) is an administrative ward in Kinondoni District of the Dar es Salaam Region in Tanzania. Mikocheni and Mwananyamala form the ward's northern and eastern borders, respectively. The ward is bordered to the south by the wards of Ndugumbi and Magomeni. Tandale and Kijitonyama wards are in the west. According to the 2012 census, the ward has a population of 68,093.

== Administration ==
The postal code for Mikocheni ward is 14107. The ward is divided into the following neighborhoods (Mitaa):

- Kisiwani, Makumbusho
- Makumbusho, Makumbusho
- Mbuyuni, Makumbusho

- Mchangani
- Minazini, Makumbusho
- Singano

=== Government ===
The ward, like every other ward in the country, has local government offices based on the population served. The Makumbusho Ward administration building houses a court as per the Ward Tribunal Act of 1988, including other vital departments for the administration the ward. The ward has the following administration offices:

- Makumbusho Ward Police Station
- Makumbusho Ward Government Office (Afisa Mtendaji)
- Makumbusho Ward Tribunal (Baraza La Kata) is a Department inside Ward Government Office

In the local government system of Tanzania, the ward is the smallest democratic unit. Each ward is composed of a committee of eight elected council members which include a chairperson, one salaried officer (with no voting rights), and an executive officer. One-third of seats are reserved for women councillors.

== Demographics ==
The Zaramo people lived in the ward and a major portion of the district at one time. As the city progressed, the ward transformed into an international neighborhood. There are 68,093 people living in the ward.

== Education and health ==
=== Education ===
The ward is home to these educational institutions:

- Kumbukumbu Primary School
- Makumbusho Primary School
- Victoria Primary School
- Holy Cross Primary School, Makumbusho
- Mchangani Primary School
- Mwananyamala "B" Primary School
- Makumbusho Secondary School

=== Healthcare ===
The ward is home to the following health institutions:

- Nasambo Healthcare Polyclinic
- Medikea Clinic
- Kisiwani Health Center, Makumbusho
- Sisa Health Center
