= Magomeni =

Ward of Kinondoni District, Dar es Salaam Region

Magomeni Kata ya Magomeni (Swahili)
- Ward of Kinondoni District
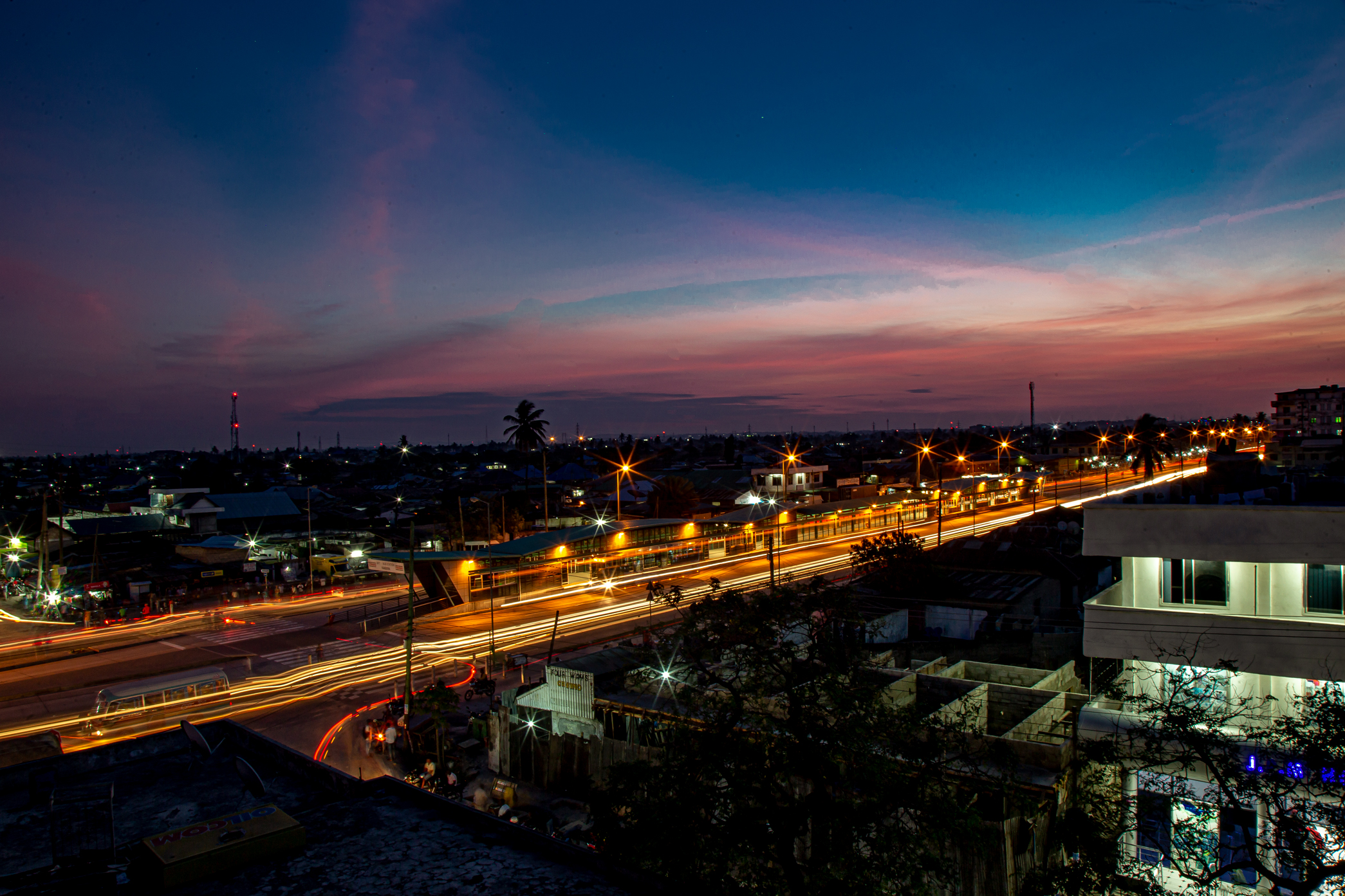
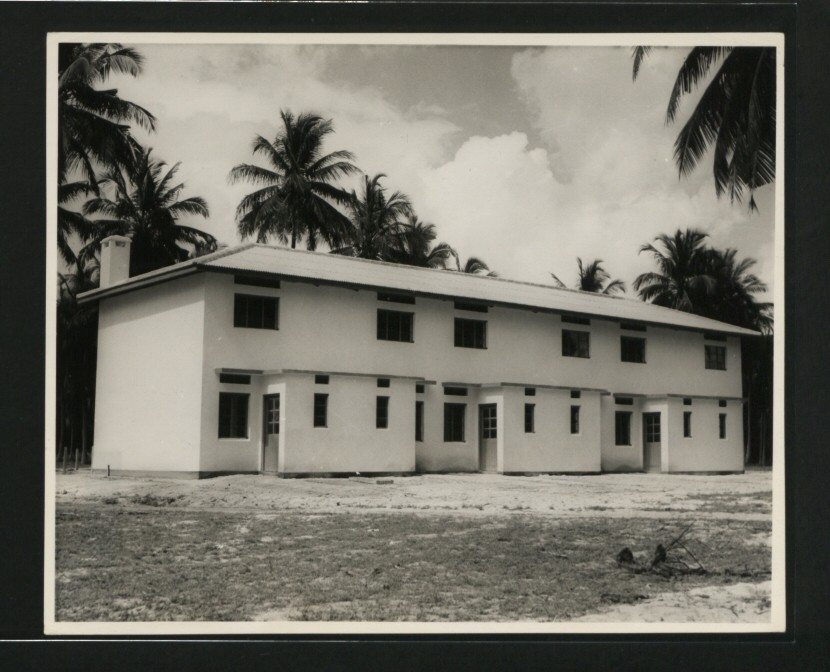
- From top to bottom: Magomeni at night & buildings in Magomeni during the British occupation
- Interactive map of Magomeni
- Coordinates: 6°48′38.88″S 39°15′34.56″E
- Country: Tanzania
- Region: Dar es Salaam Region
- District: Kinondoni District

Area
  - Total: 1 km^{2} (0.39 sq mi)

Population (2012)
  - Total: 24,400

Ethnic groups
  - Settler: Swahili
  - Ancestral: Zaramo
- Tanzanian Postal Code: 14101

Magomeni (Kata ya Magomeni, in Swahili) is an administrative ward in Kinondoni District of the Dar es Salaam Region in Tanzania. The ward is surrounded on its northern side by the wards of Makumbusho, Mwananyamala, and Hananasif. The ward is bordered to the east by the Ilala MC wards of Upanga West and Mchikichini. Wards Mzimuni and Ndugumbi form the southern and western borders. According to the 2012 census, the ward has a population of 24,400.

== Administration ==
The postal code for Magomeni ward is 14101. The ward is divided into the following neighborhoods (Mitaa):

- Dossi
- Idrisa, Magomeni
- Makuti "A"

- Makuti "B"
- Suna

=== Government ===
The ward, like every other ward in the country, has local government offices based on the population served. The Magomeni Ward administration building houses a court as per the Ward Tribunal Act of 1988, including other vital departments for the administration the ward. The ward has the following administration offices:

- Magomeni Ward Police Station
- Magomeni Ward Government Office (Afisa Mtendaji)
- Magomeni Ward Tribunal (Baraza La Kata) is a Department inside Ward Government Office

In the local government system of Tanzania, the ward is the smallest democratic unit. Each ward is composed of a committee of eight elected council members which include a chairperson, one salaried officer (with no voting rights), and an executive officer. One-third of seats are reserved for women councillors.

== Demographics ==
The Zaramo people lived in the ward and a major portion of the district at one time. As the city progressed, the ward transformed into an international neighborhood. There are 24,400 people living in the ward.

== Education and health ==
=== Education ===
The ward is home to these educational institutions:

- Mwongozo Primary School
- Hazina Primary School
- Magomeni Secoundary School

=== Healthcare ===
The ward is home to the following health institutions:

- Magomeni Dispensary
- Magomeni Health Center, Makumbusho
