= Makurumla =

Ward of Ubungo District, Dar es Salaam Region

Makurumla Kata ya Makurumla (Swahili)
- Ward of Ubungo District
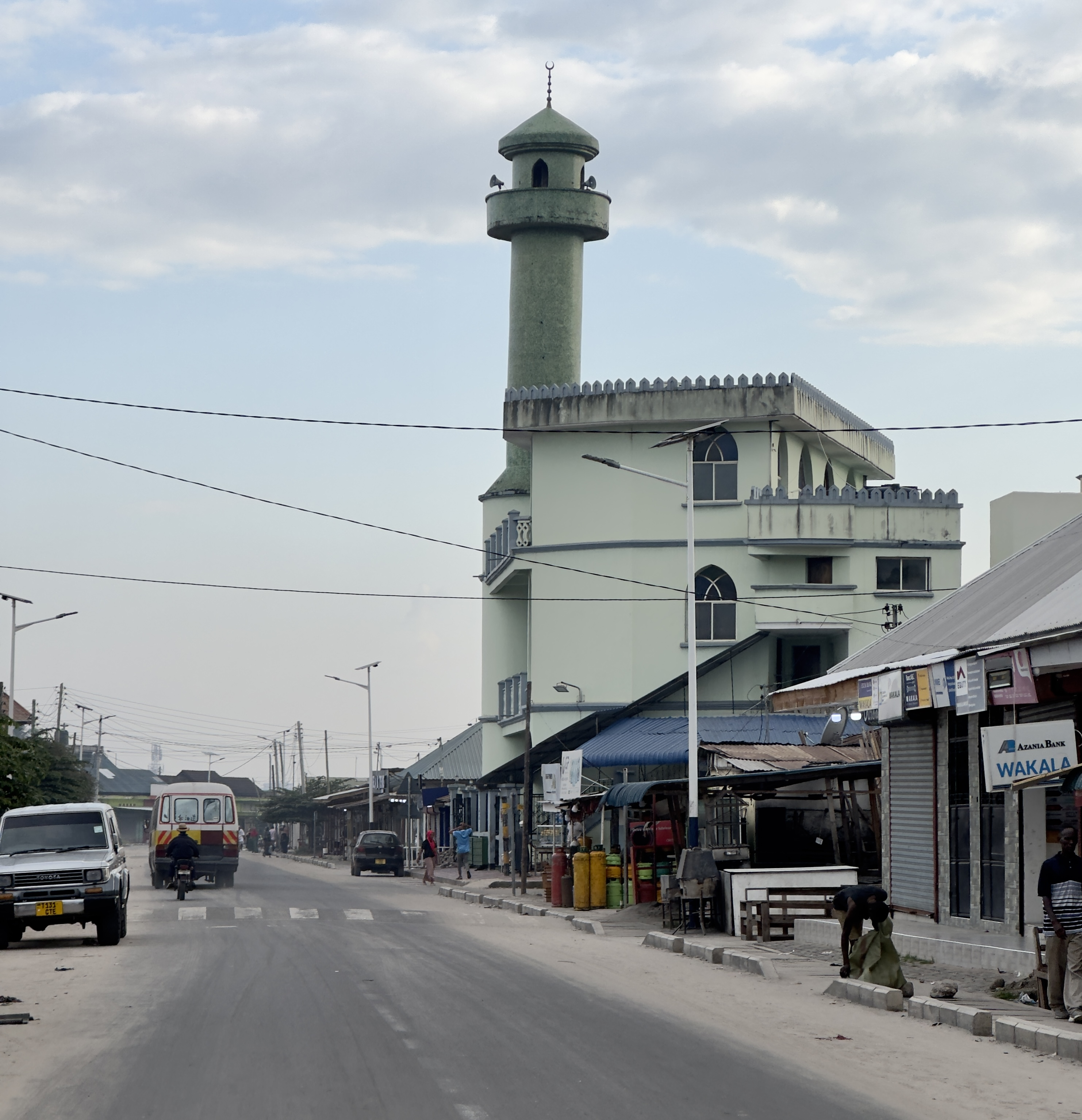
- From top to bottom: Masjid Al-Khalil in Makurumla ward

- Location within Tanzania
- Coordinates: 6°48′21.96″S 39°14′30.84″E
- Country: Tanzania
- Region: Dar es Salaam Region
- District: Ubungo District

Area
  - Total: 1.5 km^{2} (0.58 sq mi)

Population (2012)
  - Total: 63,352
- Demonym: Makurumlan

Ethnic groups
  - Settler: Swahili
  - Ancestral: Zaramo
- Tanzanian Postal Code: 16107

Makurumla (Kata ya Makurumla in Swahili) is an administrative ward in Ubungo District of the Dar es Salaam Region in Tanzania. The Kinondoni Municipal District's Ndugumbi ward borders the ward on the north. Mzimuni Ward to the east, Mburahati and Mabibo to the south were its neighbors. Lastly, via Manzese ward towards the west. In 2016 the Tanzania National Bureau of Statistics report there were 79,331 people in the ward, from 63,352 in 2012.

== Administration ==
The postal code for Makurumla Ward is 16107. The ward is divided into the following neighborhoods (Mitaa):

- Kagera
- Kilimahewa
- Kimamba

- Kwa Jongo
- Mianzini
- Sisi kwa Sisi

=== Government ===
Like every other ward in the country, the ward has local government offices based on the population served. The Makurumla Ward administration building houses a court as per the Ward Tribunal Act of 1988, including other vital departments for the administration of the ward. The ward has the following administration offices:

- Makurumla Ward Police Station
- Makurumla Ward Government Office (Afisa Mtendaji)
- Makurumla Ward Tribunal (Baraza La Kata) is a Department inside Ward Government Office

In the local government system of Tanzania, the ward is the smallest democratic unit. Each ward comprises a committee of eight elected council members, including a chairperson, one salaried officer (with no voting rights), and an executive officer. One-third of seats are reserved for women councilors.

== Demographics ==
The ward serves as the Zaramo's ancestral home along with a sizable chunk of the district. The ward changed over time into a cosmopolitan ward as the city grew.

== Education and health ==
=== Education ===
The ward is home to these educational institutions:

- Karume Primary School
- Darajani Nursery School
- Makurumla Primary School
- Mianzini Primary School
- Omar Ally Juma Primary School
- Makurumla Secondary School
- Tanzania Bible School, Makurumla

=== Healthcare ===
The ward is home to the following health institutions:

- Mburahati Health Center
- Istiquama Hospital, Makurumla
- Mwembechai Clinic
