= Mdundiko =

Dance of the Zaramo people

Mdundiko is one of the traditional and ritual dances (ngoma) of the Zaramo people living in the Dar es Salaam area, in Tanzania. Mdundiko dances are associated with weddings and the rites of passage celebrating female puberty.

The mdundiko style has inspired some modern popular Tanzanian music. The bongo flava group "Mambo Jambo", for example, mix western hip hop/rap and mdundiko rhythms (their first single was entitled Hip-Hop Mdundiko).
