= Mwananyamala =

Ward of Kinondoni District, Dar es Salaam Region

Mwananyamala Kata ya Mwananyamala (Swahili)
- Ward of Kinondoni District
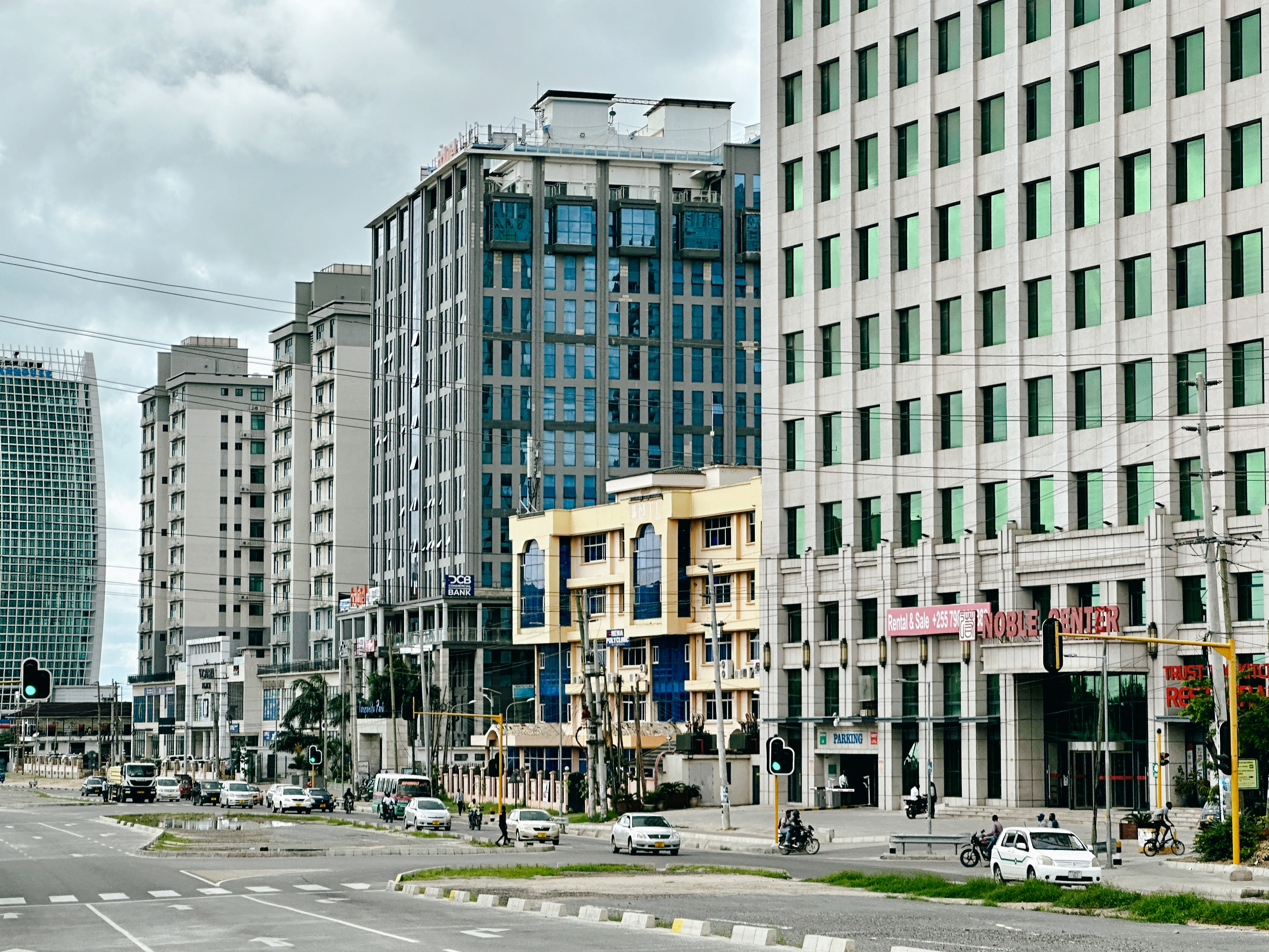
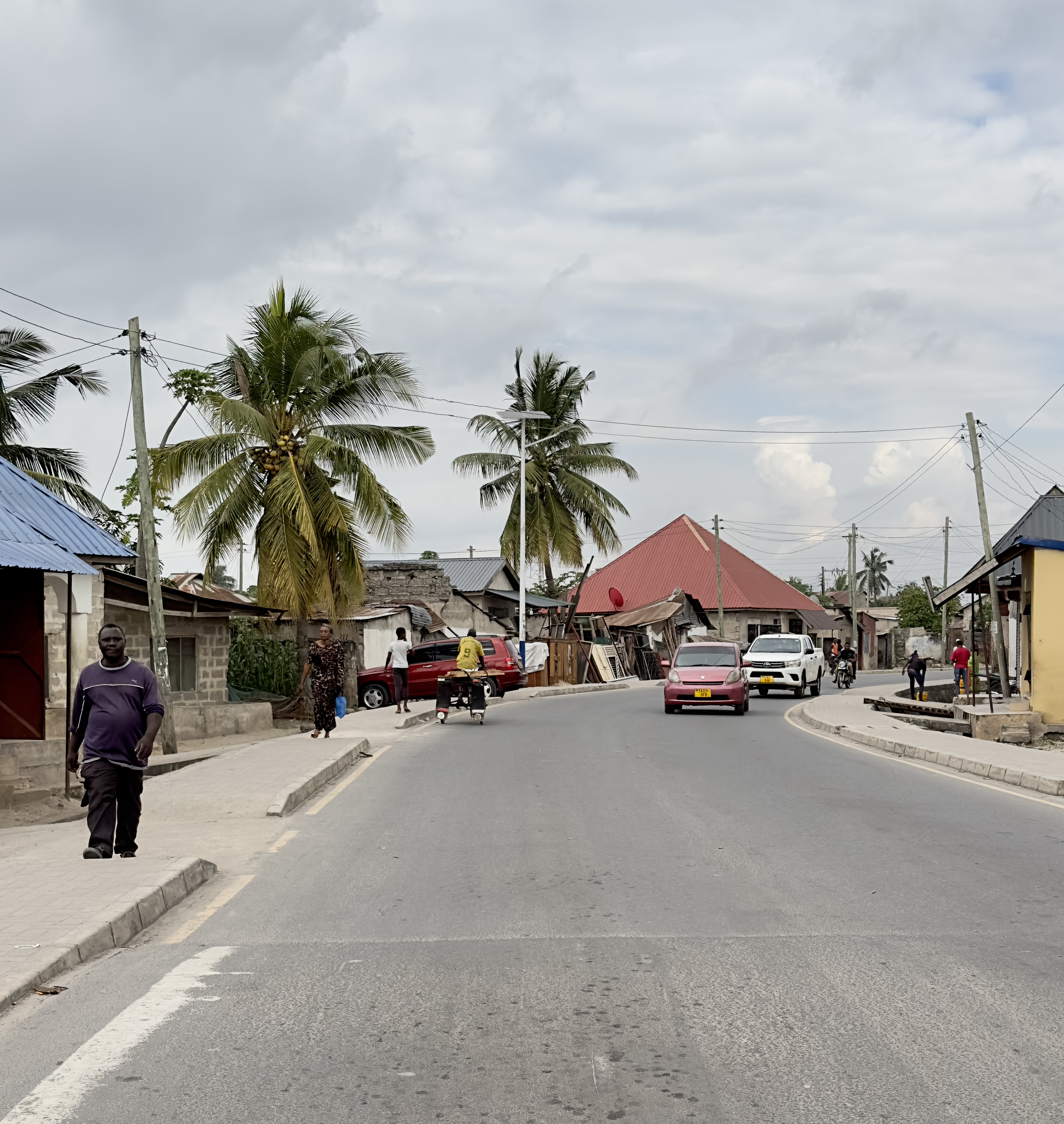
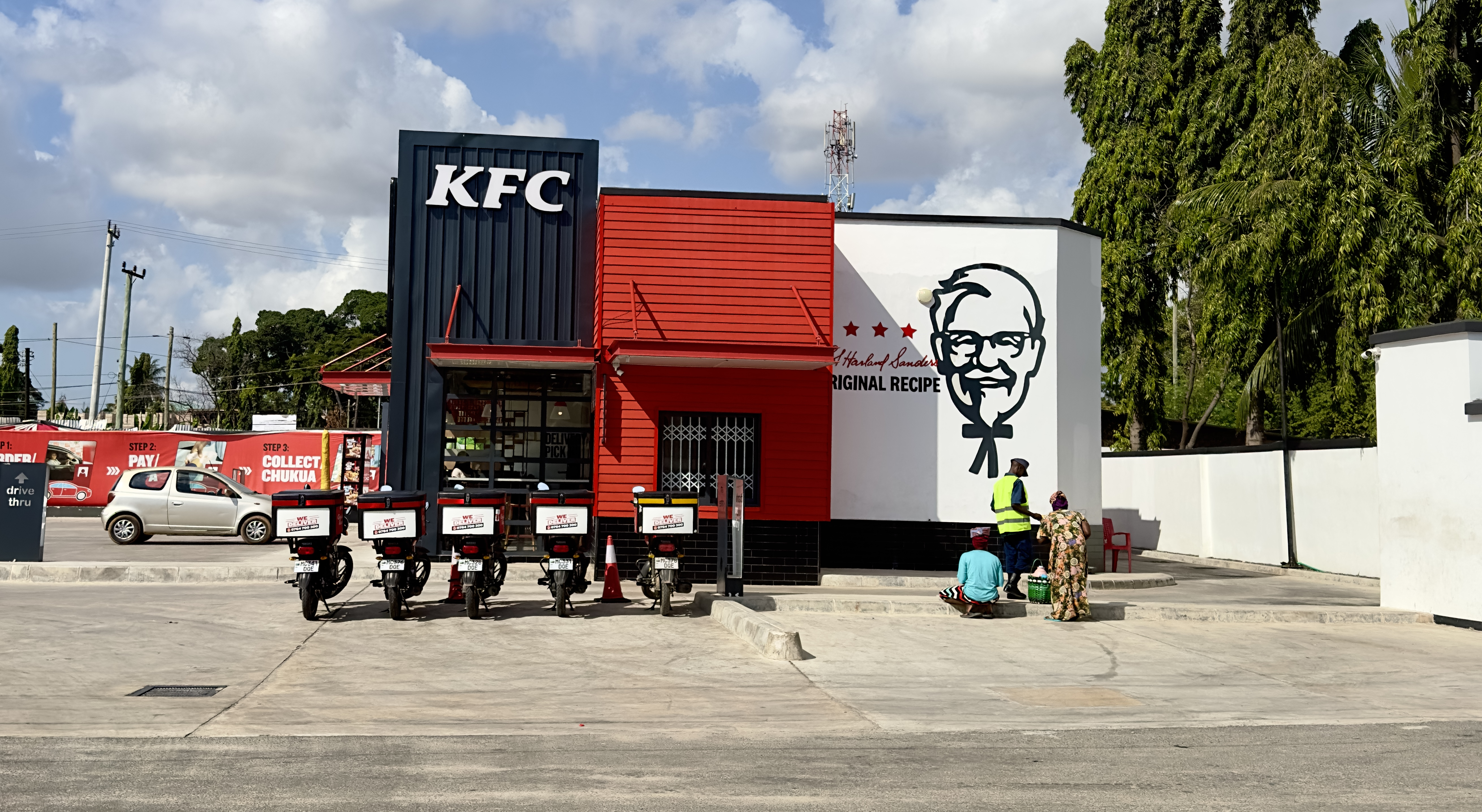
- From top to bottom: Mwananyamala from Bagamoyo Rd, Central Mwananyamala street scene & KFC restaurant in Mwananyamala
- Interactive map of Mwananyamala
- Coordinates: 6°47′6.47″S 39°15′27″E
- Country: Tanzania
- Region: Dar es Salaam Region
- District: Kinondoni District

Area
  - Total: 2.4 km^{2} (0.93 sq mi)

Population (2012)
  - Total: 50,560

Ethnic groups
  - Settler: Swahili
  - Ancestral: Zaramo
- Tanzanian Postal Code: 14108

Mwananyamala is an administrative ward in Kinondoni District of the Dar es Salaam Region in Tanzania. The ward is bordered to the north by Mikocheni ward and to the east by Msasani and Kinondoni. The ward borders Hananasif and Magomeni to the south. Makumbusho ward is the final ward to the west. According to the 2012 census, the ward has a population of 54,781.

== Administration ==
The postal code for Mwananyamala ward is 14108. The ward is divided into the following neighborhoods (Mitaa):

- Bwawani
- Kambangwa
- Kwa Kopa
- Msisiri "A"

- Msisiri "B"
- Msolomi
- Mwinjuma

=== Government ===
The ward, like every other ward in the country, has local government offices based on the population served. The Mwananyamala Ward administration building has a court as per the Ward Tribunal Act of 1988, including other vital departments for the administration of the ward. The ward has the following administration offices:

- Mwananyamala Ward Police Station
- Mwananyamala Ward Government Office (Afisa Mtendaji)
- Mwananyamala Ward Tribunal (Baraza La Kata) is a Department inside Ward Government Office

In the local government system of Tanzania, the ward is the smallest democratic unit. Each ward is composed of a committee of eight elected council members which include a chairperson, one salaried officer (with no voting rights), and an executive officer. One-third of seats are reserved for women councillors.

== Demographics ==
The ward and a sizable chunk of the district were originally home of the Zaramo people. The ward evolved into an international community as the city grew. The ward is home to 50,560 residents.

== Education and health ==
=== Education ===
The ward is home to these educational institutions:

- Mwongozo Primary School
- Kabangwa Secondary School
- Ridhwaa Seminary Secondary School

=== Healthcare ===
The ward is home to the following health institutions:

- Msisiri Dispensary
- Komakoma Polyclinic
- Kaja Health Center
- Euro Health Center
- Mwananyamala Hospital
- Kinondoni Hospital
