= Hananasif =

Ward of Kinondoni District, Dar es Salaam Region

Hananasif Kata ya Hananasif (Swahili)
- Ward of Kinondoni District
- From top to bottom
- Interactive map of Hananasif
- Coordinates: 6°47′42″S 39°16′8.4″E
- Country: Tanzania
- Region: Dar es Salaam Region
- District: Kinondoni District

Area
  - Total: 1.8 km^{2} (0.69 sq mi)

Population (2012)
  - Total: 37,115

Ethnic groups
  - Settler: Swahili
  - Ancestral: Zaramo
- Tanzanian Postal Code: 14109

Hananasif also spelled, Hana Nasif (Kata ya Hananasif, in Swahili) is an administrative ward in Kinondoni District of the Dar es Salaam Region in Tanzania. The ward is surrounded to the north by the wards of Kinondoni and Msasani. The ward is bordered to the east by Kivukoni and Upanga West of Ilala MC. The ward is bordered by Mwanayamala to the west and Magomeni to the south. The ward is home to the well-known Kinondoni Cemetery, where notable figures like Herman Lupogo, Steve Kabyumba, and Josina Machel are interred. The ward is home to the Embassy of Russia and the Embassy of Switzerland. According to the 2012 census, the ward has a population of 37,115.

== Administration ==
The postal code for Hananasif ward is 14109. The ward is divided into the following neighborhoods (Mitaa):

- Hananasif
- Kawawa
- Kisutu, Hananasif

- Mkunguni "A"
- Mkunguni "B"

=== Government ===
The ward, like every other ward in the country, has local government offices based on the population served. The Hananasif Ward administration building houses a court as per the Ward Tribunal Act of 1988, including other vital departments for the administration the ward. The ward has the following administration offices:

- Hananasif Police Station
- Hananasif Government Office (Afisa Mtendaji)
- Hananasif Tribunal (Baraza La Kata) is a Department inside Ward Government Office

In the local government system of Tanzania, the ward is the smallest democratic unit. Each ward is composed of a committee of eight elected council members which include a chairperson, one salaried officer (with no voting rights), and an executive officer. One-third of seats are reserved for women councillors.

== Demographics ==
The Zaramo people lived in the ward and a major portion of the district at one time. As the city progressed, the ward transformed into an international neighborhood. There are 37,115 people living in the ward.

== Education and health ==
=== Education ===
The ward is home to these educational institutions:

- Hananasif Primary School
- Hananasif Secondary School
- C College

=== Healthcare ===
The ward is home to the following health institutions:

- Kinondoni Hospital, Hananasif
- Shifa Pan African Hospital
