= Msasani =

Ward of Kinondoni District, Dar es Salaam Region

Msasani Kata ya Msasani (Swahili)
- Ward of Kinondoni District
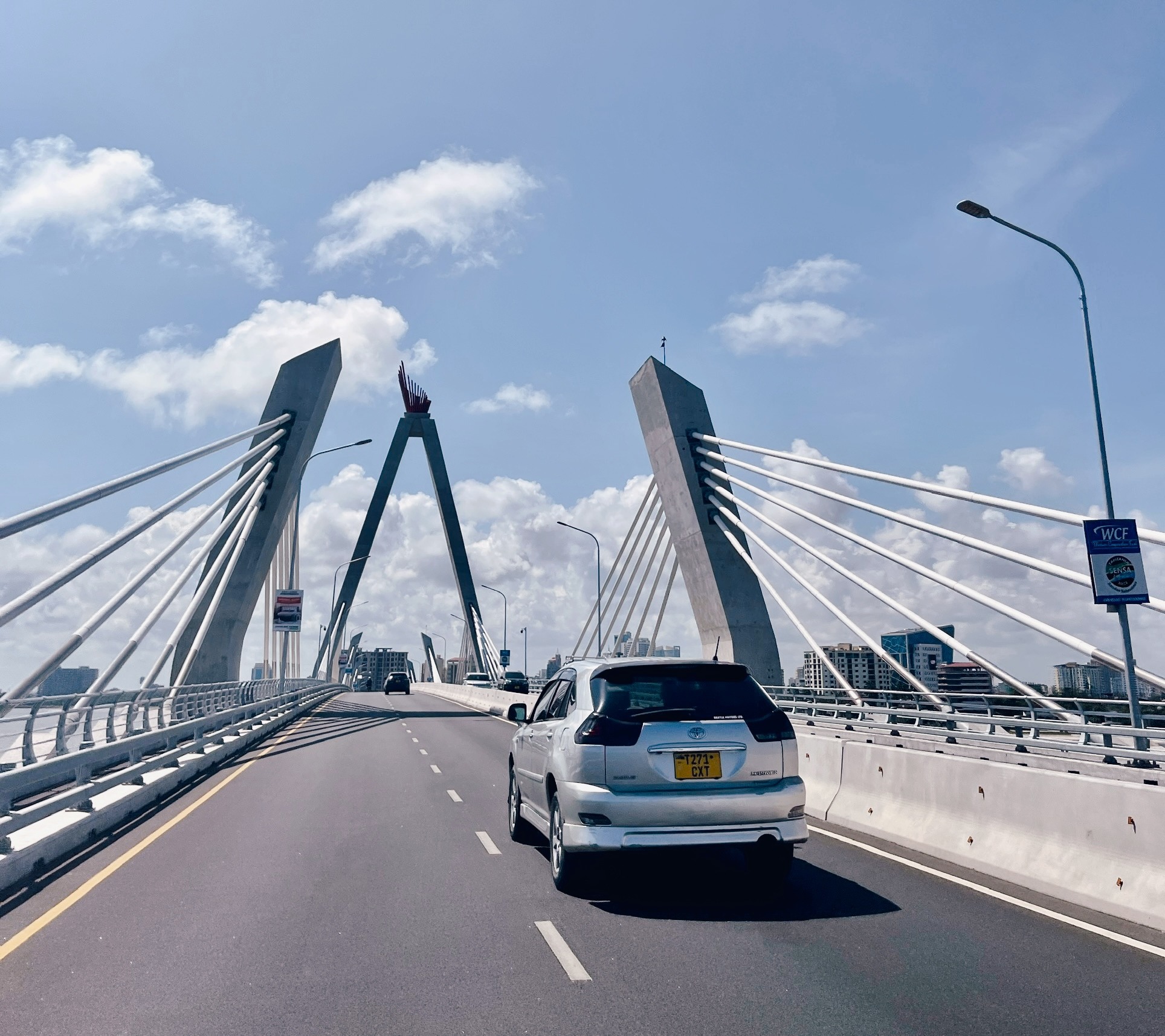
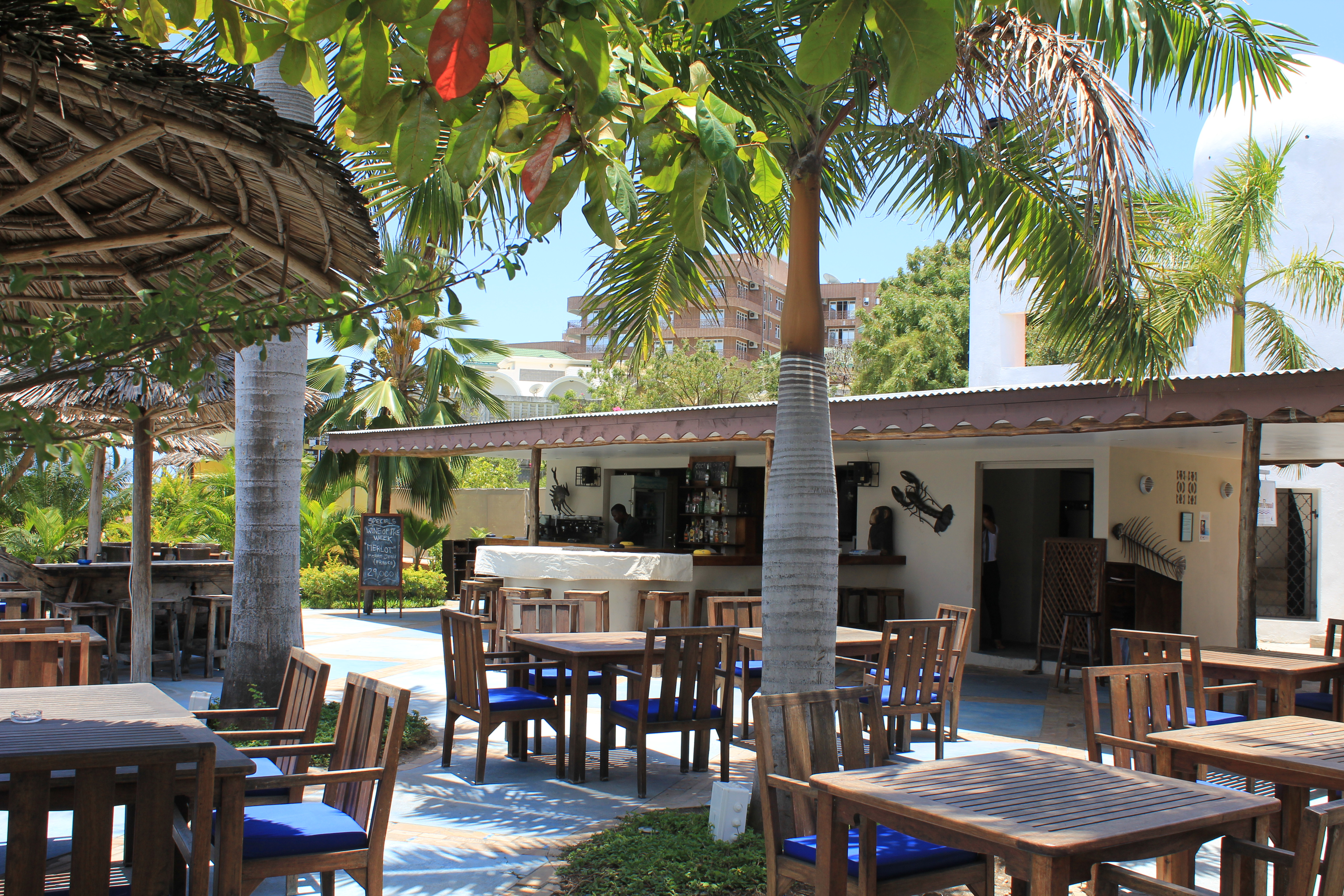
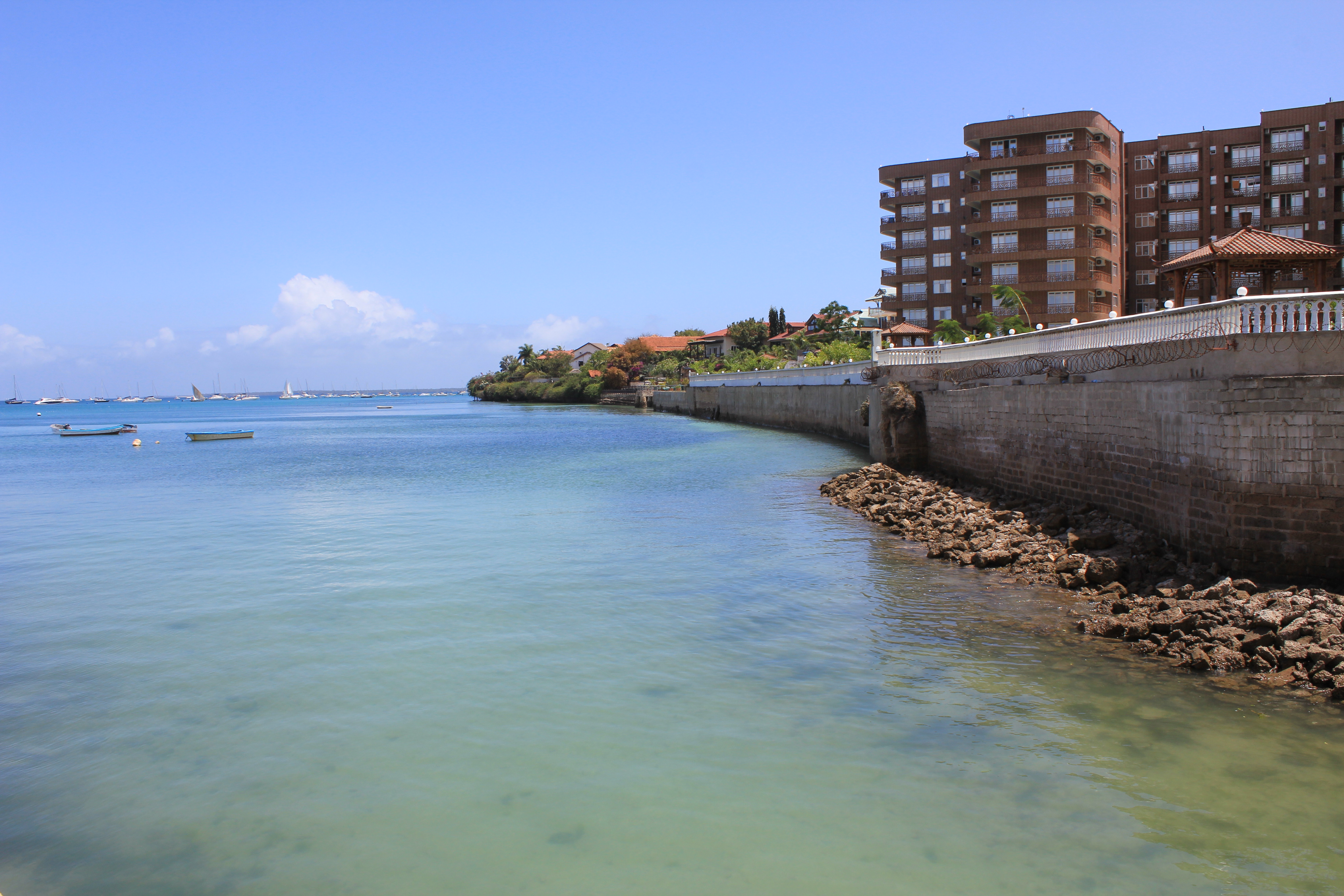
- From top to bottom: Tanzanite Bridge crossing from Msasani to Kivukoni ward Restaurant in Msasani; Shoreline in Msasani
- Interactive map of Msasani
- Coordinates: 6°44′50.64″S 39°16′54.12″E
- Country: Tanzania
- Region: Dar es Salaam Region
- District: Kinondoni District

Area
  - Total: 11.12 km^{2} (4.29 sq mi)

Population (2012)
  - Total: 48,920

Ethnic groups
  - Settler: Swahili
  - Ancestral: Zaramo
- Tanzanian Postal Code: 14111

Msasani (Kata ya Msasani, in Swahili) is an administrative ward in Kinondoni District of the Dar es Salaam Region in Tanzania. The ward is bordered to the north and east by the Indian Ocean. Kinondoni, Hananasif and Kivukoni ward of Ilala MC border the ward to the south. Lastly, Mikocheni and Kawe to the west. Msasani is named after Medieval Swahili settlement that used to exist in the ward. According to the 2012 census, the ward has a population of 48,920.

== Administration ==
The postal code for Msasani ward is 14111. The ward is divided into the following neighborhoods (Mitaa):

- Bonde la Mpunga
- Makangira
- Masaki
- Mikoroshoni
- Oysterbay

=== Government ===
The ward, like every other ward in the country, has local government offices based on the population served. The Msasani Ward administration building houses a court as per the Ward Tribunal Act of 1988, including other vital departments for the administration the ward. The ward has the following administration offices:

- Msasani Ward Police Station
- Msasani Ward Government Office (Afisa Mtendaji)
- Msasani Ward Tribunal (Baraza La Kata) is a Department inside Ward Government Office

In the local government system of Tanzania, the ward is the smallest democratic unit. Each ward is composed of a committee of eight elected council members which include a chairperson, one salaried officer (with no voting rights), and an executive officer. One-third of seats are reserved for women councillors.

== Demographics ==
The ward and a sizable chunk of the district were originally home to the Zaramo people. The ward evolved into an international community as the city grew. The ward is home to 48,920 residents.

== Education and health ==
=== Education ===
The ward is home to these educational institutions:

- Msasani "A" Primary School
- Msasani "B" Primary School
- Oysterbay Primary School
- Msasani Islamic Primary School
- Bongoyo Primarys School
- The Apton School
- Good Samaritan Primary School
- Al-Irshaad Primary School
- Filbert Bayi Primary School
- Oysterbay Secondary School
- Peninsula English Medium School

=== Healthcare ===
The ward is home to the following health institutions:

- Bonde la Mpunga Dispensary
- Oysterbay Clinic
- IST Clinic
- London Health Center, Msasani
- AfyaMedicare Polyclinic
- New Msasani Health Center
- Msasani Peninsula Hospital

== See also ==
- Historic Swahili Settlements
