= Ndugumbi =

Ward of Kinondoni District, Dar es Salaam Region

Ndugumbi Kata ya Ndugumbi (Swahili)
- Ward of Kinondoni District
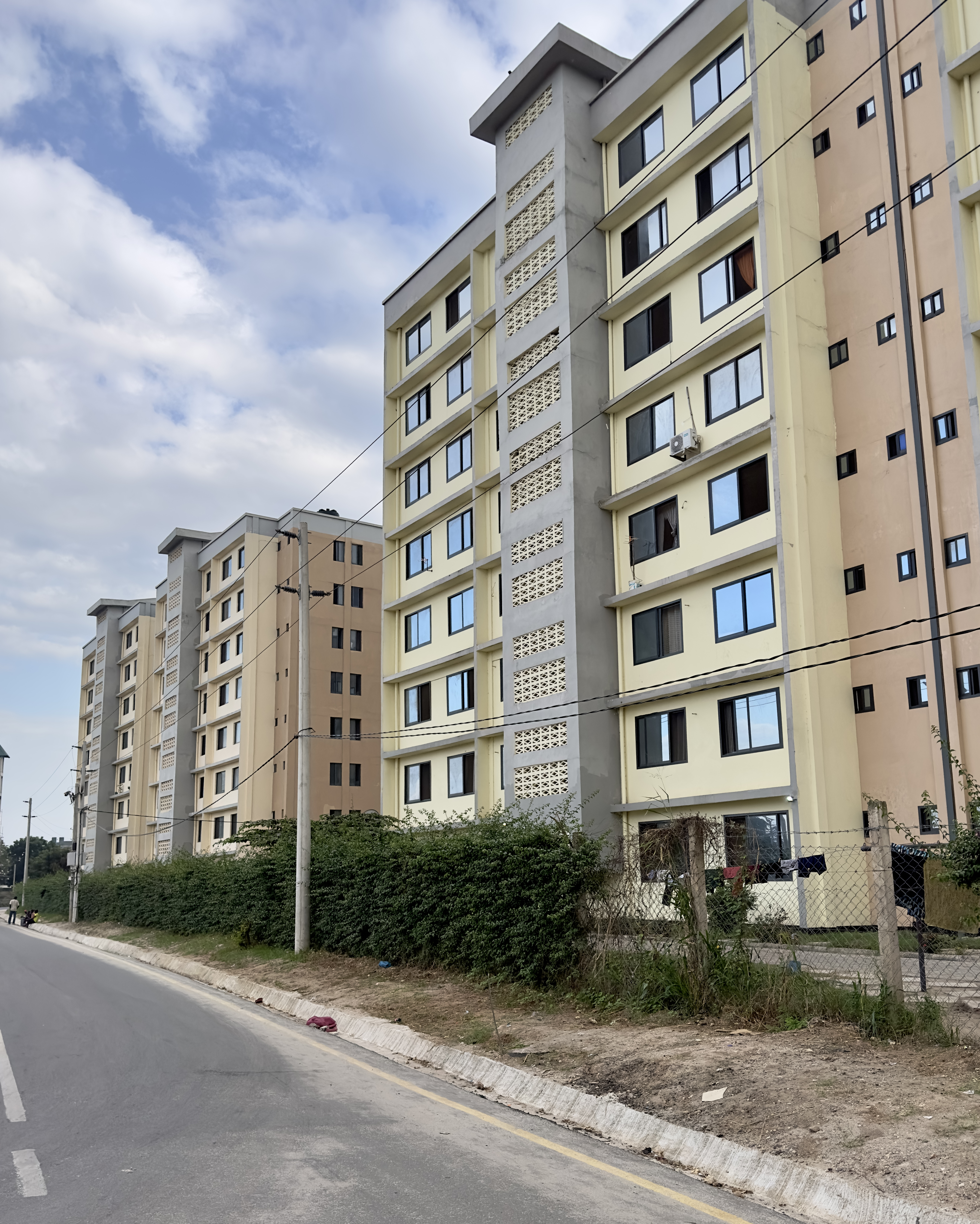
- From top to bottom: Kota za Magomeni in Ndugumbi
- Nickname: Kionondoni's capital
- Location within Tanzania
- Coordinates: 6°48′5.76″S 39°14′47.04″E
- Country: Tanzania
- Region: Dar es Salaam Region
- District: Kinondoni District

Area
  - Total: 1.315 km^{2} (0.508 sq mi)

Population (2016)
  - Total: 46,134
- Demonym: Ndugumbian

Ethnic groups
  - Settler: Swahili
  - Ancestral: Zaramo
- Tanzanian Postal Code: 14104

Ndugumbi (Kata ya Ndugumbi in Swahili) is an administrative ward and district capital of the Kinondoni District of the Dar es Salaam Region in Tanzania. Tandale and Makumbusho ward border the ward to the north, Mzimuni to the east, Makurumla to the south and Manzese on the west. The last two being located in Ubungo District. In 2016 the Tanzania National Bureau of Statistics report there were 46,134 people in the ward, from 36,841 in 2012.

== Economy ==
The Ndugumbi ward is home to the Kinondoni Municipal Office, The Office of the District Commissioner, and many other local government offices. Ndugumbi hosts the Magomeni health center and the Argentina markert.

== Demographics ==
The ward is the Zaramo people's ancestral home, much like the majority of the district. As the city grew throughout time, the ward became into a cosmopolitan ward.

== Administration ==
The postal code for Ndugumbi Ward is 14104. The ward is divided into the following neighborhoods (Mitaa):

- Makanya
- Mikoroshoni
- Mpakani
- Vigaeni

=== Government ===
The ward, like every other ward in the country, has local government offices based on the population served. The Ndugumbi Ward administration building houses a court as per the Ward Tribunal Act of 1988, including other vital departments for the administration the ward. The ward has the following administration offices:

- Ndugumbi Ward Police Station
- Ndugumbi Ward Government Office (Afisa Mtendaji, Kata ya Ndugumbi)
- Ndugumbi Ward Tribunal (Baraza La Kata) is a Department inside Ward Government Office

In the local government system of Tanzania, the ward is the smallest democratic unit. Each ward is composed of a committee of eight elected council members which include a chairperson, one salaried officer (with no voting rights), and an executive officer. One-third of seats are reserved for women councillors.

== Education and health ==
=== Education ===
The ward is home to these educational institutions:

- Ndugumbi Primary School
- Turiani Secondary School
- Turiani Secondary School
- Dar es Salaam Baptist Secoundary School, Ndugumbi

=== Healthcare ===
The ward is home to the following health institutions:

- Magomeni Health Center
- Cradle Health Center
- Suby Maternity Home
- JPM Health Center
- AB Hospital Dar es Salaam
