= Kinondoni District =

District of Dar es Salaam Region, Tanzania

Kinondoni District Halimashauri ya Manispaa ya Kinondoni (Swahili)
- District of Dar es Salaam
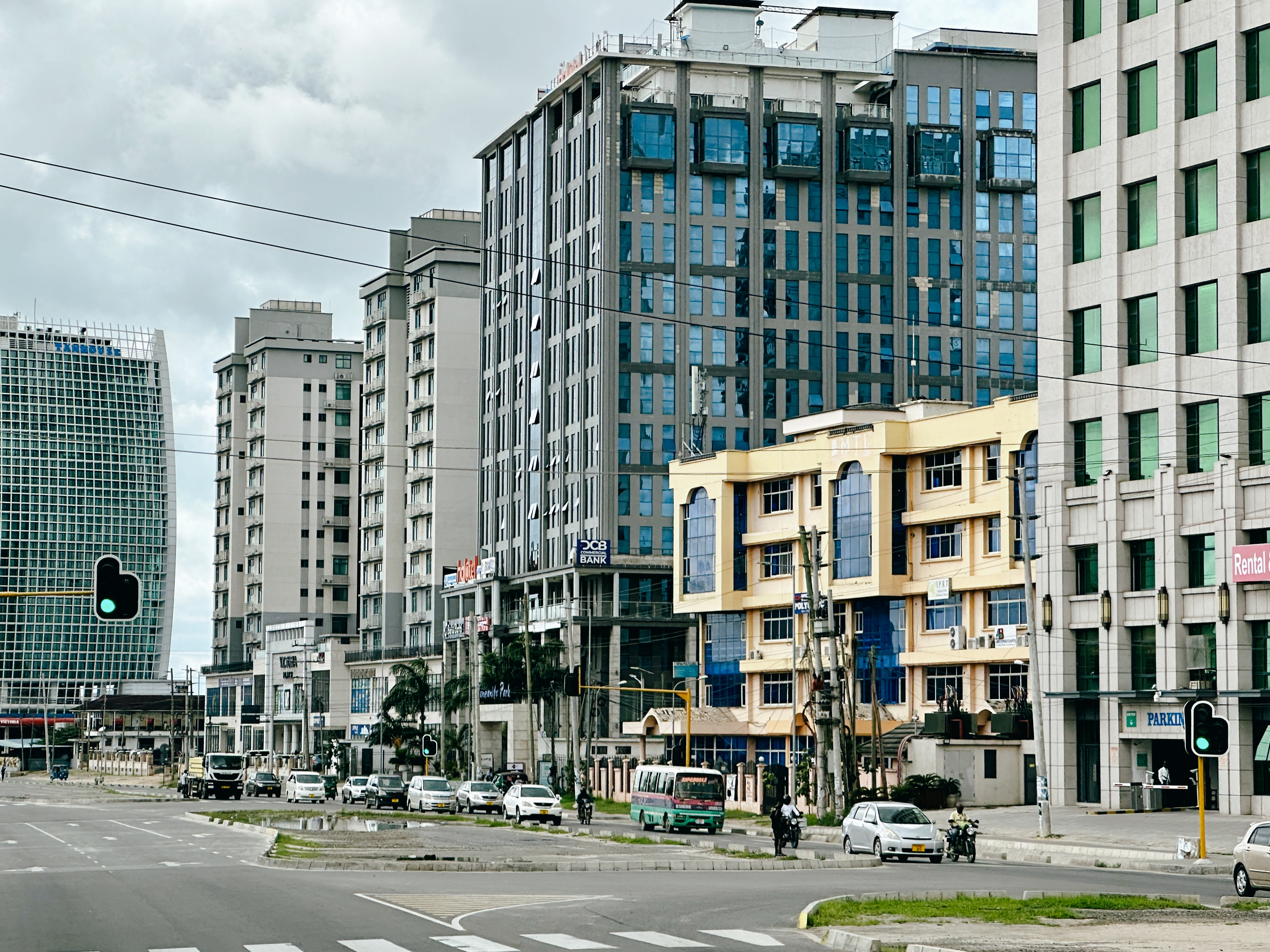
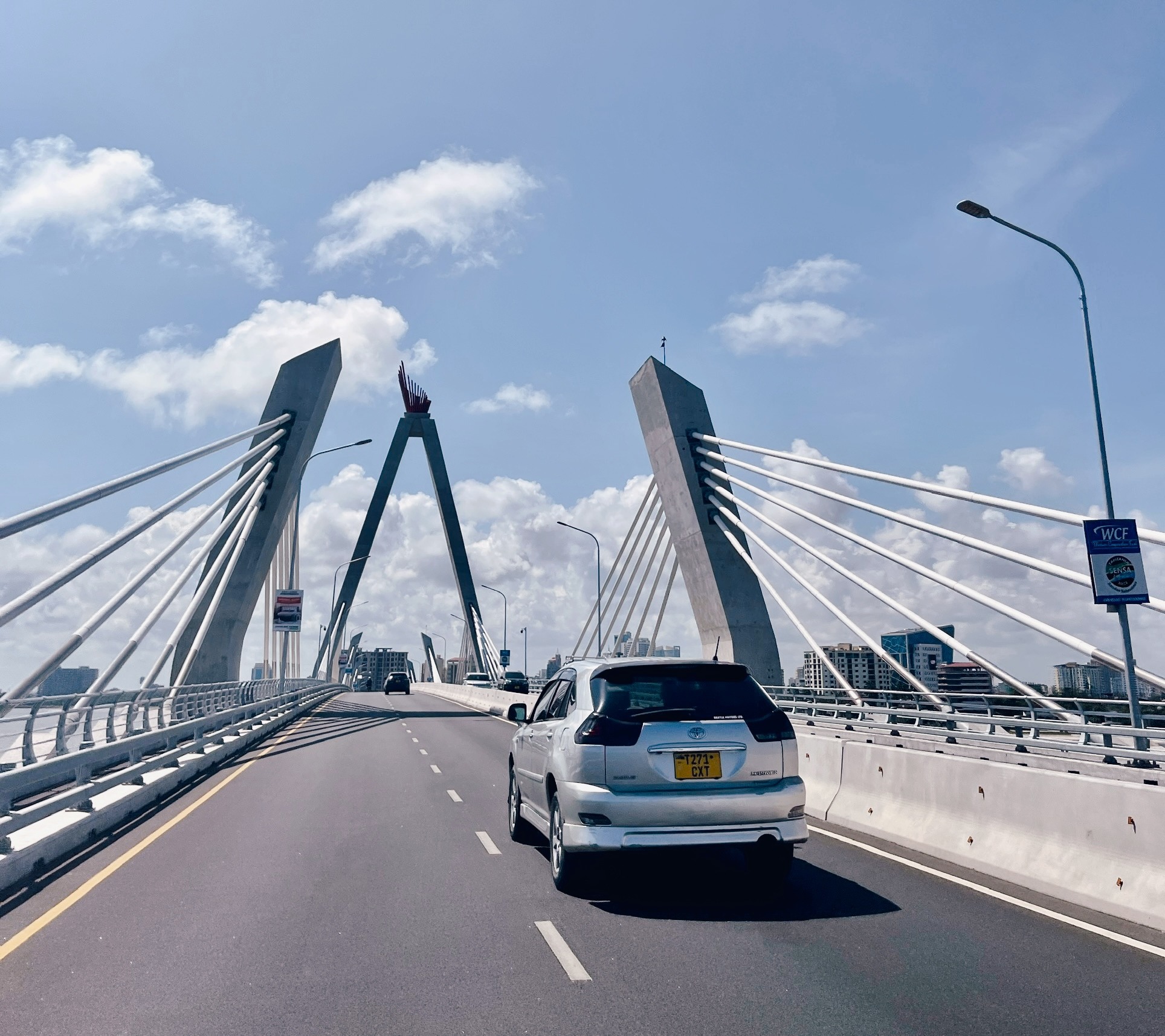
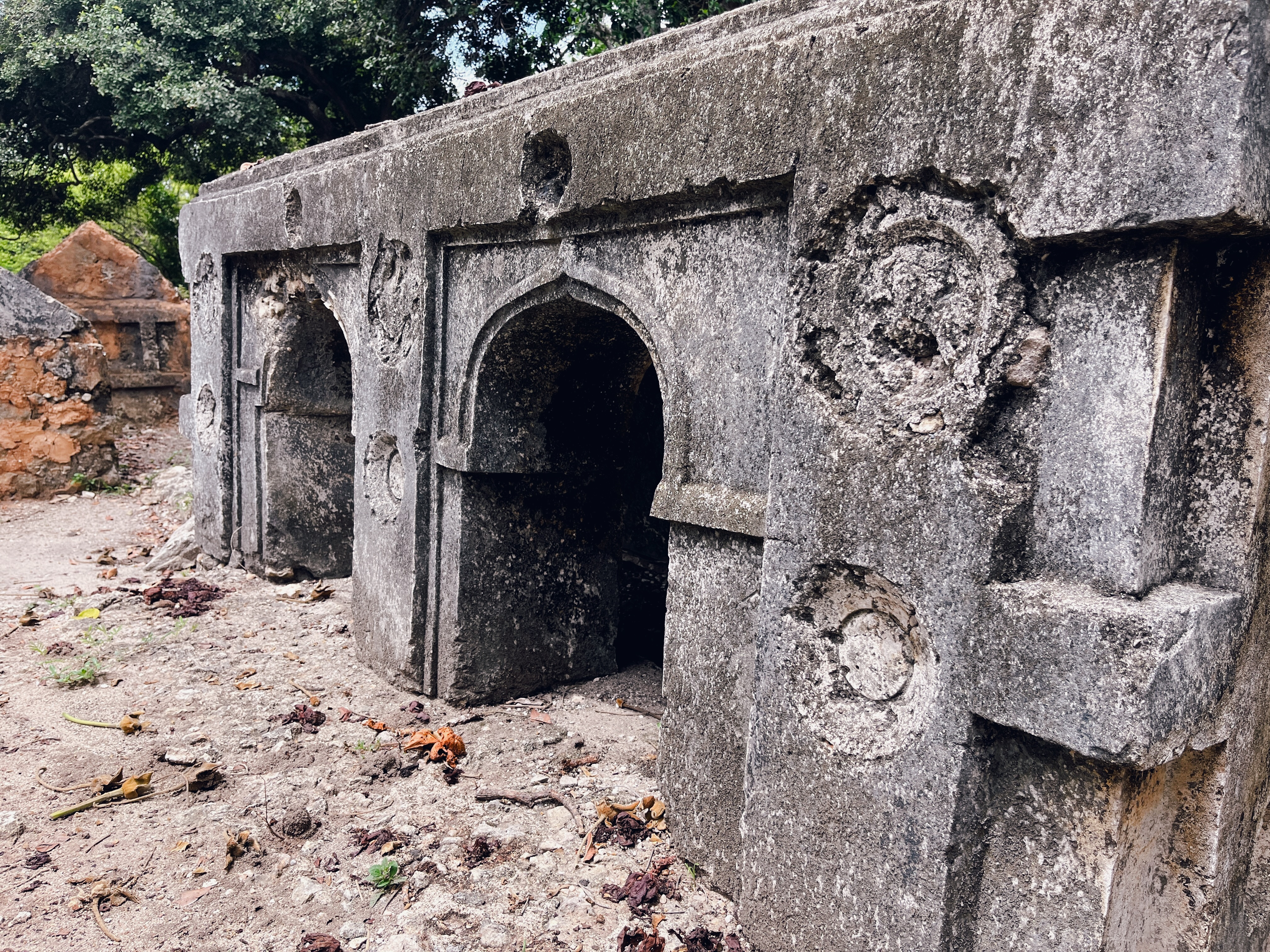
- From top to bottom: Bagamoyo Road in Mwananyamala ward, Tanzanite Bridge connecting Kinondoni District's Msasani ward with Kivukoni ward in Ilala District & Kunduchi Ruins
- Nickname: The cultural district
- Kinondoni District in Dar
- Coordinates: 6°42′19.08″S 39°6′45.72″E
- Country: Tanzania
- Region: Dar es Salaam Region
- District: 2000
- Named for: Kinondoni village
- Capital: Ndugumbi

Area
  - Total: 269.5 km^{2} (104.1 sq mi)
  - Rank: 3rd in Dar
- Highest elevation (Mabwepande): 290 m (950 ft)

Population (2022 census)
  - Total: 982,328
  - Rank: 4th in Dar
  - Density: 3,645/km^{2} (9,441/sq mi)
- Demonym: Kinondonian

Ethnic groups
  - Settler: Swahili
  - Native: Zaramo
- Time zone: UTC+3 (EAT)
- Tanzanian Postcode: 141
- Website: Official website
- Symbols of Tanzania
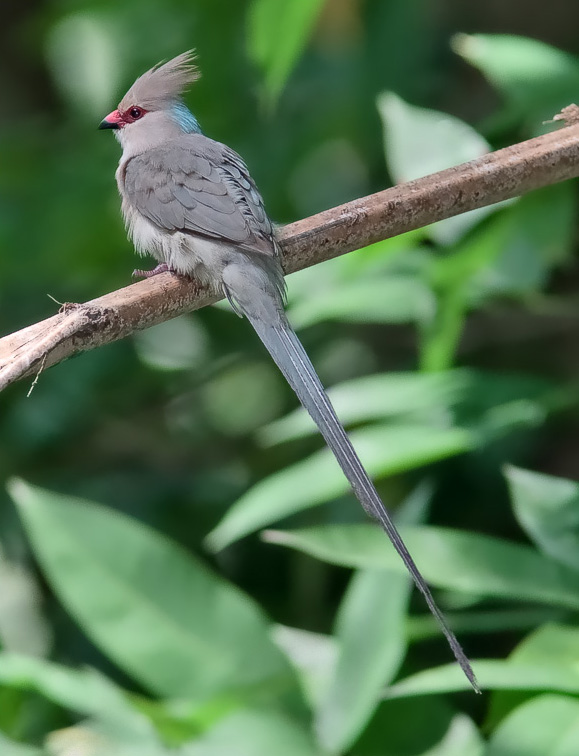
- Bird: Blue-naped mousebird

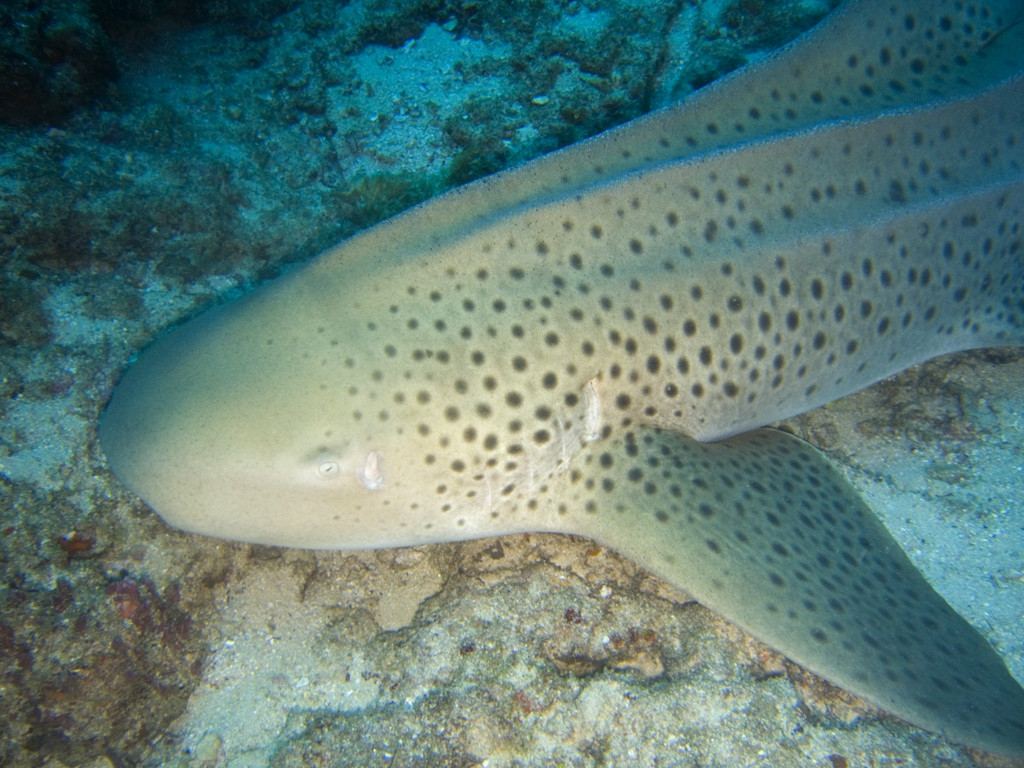
- Fish: Zebra shark
- Mammal: Rondo dwarf galago

Kinondoni District, officially the Kinondoni Municipal Council (Halimashauri ya Manispaa ya Kinondoni, in Swahili) is one of five districts of the Dar es Salaam Region of Tanzania. The district is bordered to the north by Bagamoyo District and Kibaha of Pwani Region, to the east by the Indian Ocean, the west by Ubungo District, and to the south by the Ilala District. The district covers an area of 269.5 km^{2} (104.1 sq mi). The district is comparable in size to the land area of Malta. The administrative seat is Ndugumbi. The district is home to one of the best preserved Medieval Swahili settlements, Kunduchi Ruins, headquarters for the National Muslim Council of Tanzania (BAKWATA) and Makumbusho Village Museum. Considered the cultural center of Dar es Salaam, Kinondoni District is also regarded the birthplace of the musical genre of Singeli. In addition the district is one of two districts in Dar es Salaam that has a National Historic Site, namely the Kunduchi Ruins. The 2012 National Tanzania Census states the population for Kinondoni as 1,775,049.

== Administration ==
Twenty (20) wards and 106 sub-wards make up the Kinondoni Municipal Council. Kawe and Kinondoni are the two electoral districts that make up the Municipal. The Full Council, which oversees municipal affairs, is made up of 34 members, including 20 councilors who are chosen from each ward, two Members of Parliament (MPs), six women who hold special seats, and six presidential appointees. The Kinondoni Municipal Council has grown to employ 4,161 people in total.

=== Wards ===
Below is a list of the wards in Kinondoni District:

1. Bunju
2. Hananasif
3. Kawe
4. Kigogo
5. Kijitonyama
6. Kinondoni
7. Kunduchi
8. Mabwepande
9. Magomeni
10. Makongo
11. Makumbusho
12. Mbezi Juu
13. Mbweni
14. Mikocheni
15. Msasani
16. Mwananyamala
17. Mzimuni
18. Ndugumbi
19. Tandale
20. Wazo

== Geography ==
=== Climate ===
Climate-wise, Kinondoni Municipality has a tropical equatorial climate. The district is typically warm and humid with an annual average temperature of 29 °C. The drier months of October through March are the warmest, whereas May through August are comparatively moderate with temperatures about 25 °C. There are two distinct rainy seasons: a brief period from October to December and a longer one from March to May. 1,300 mm of rain falls annually on average. In the mornings, there is about 96% humidity, while in the afternoons, 67%. The southwest monsoon winds, which blow from April to October, and the northeast monsoon winds, which blow from November to March, both have an impact on the overall climate.

=== Topography ===
Dunes and tidal wetlands make up the shorelines closest to the Indian Ocean. Hills in Kinondoni have unconsolidated clay bond sands, well-drained slopes, and weathered slopes. There are also sporadic outcrops of elevated coral limestone, especially around the Wazo and Kunduchi areas. At Kawe, a limestone coastal plain rises in the north before descending to a distance of eight kilometers at the Mpiji River. Clay soils, zero gradient, and numerous small lakes and ponds are present across this landform, which hinders natural drainage. River valleys cut the coastal plain into a succession of steep-sided U-shaped valleys that end in cracks and mangrove swamps before reaching the Indian Ocean. Silt Clay soils that are laden with clay materials typically have poor drainage and are found in valleys. Rivers in Kinondoni District include the Mbezi, Tegeta, Nyakasangwe and Mpiji Rivers. Islands in Kigamboni Include Mbudya Island, Pangavini Island, Fungu Yasini Island and Bongoyo Island which are part of the Dar es Salaam Marine Reserve.

Both natural and man-made forests exist in Kinondoni. Old-growth forests consists of lowland vegetation with sporadic dominant trees, bushes, tall grasses, and mangrove forests, particularly near the shore and river estuaries, whereas man-made forests are composed of trees that have been planted by the National forest department and are overseen by Kinondoni ward governments. The Pande Forest in Mabwepade ward, which has 3,030 acres of land and was first designated as a forest reserve in the 1960s, is located about 15 kilometers off the Bagamoyo Road. In the 1990s, the area was renamed the Pande Game Reserve to accommodate several species of wild animals, including key species like Blue-naped mousebird and the endemic Rondo dwarf galago.

== Economy ==
=== Infrastructure ===
==== Roads ====
The Kinondoni Municipal Council is responsible for maintaining 1,510.22 km of roads, of which 143.26 km are asphalt, 378.49 km are gravel, and 988.47 km are earth roads. There is currently 110,000 meters worth of storm water drains in the network as it stands.

==== Water ====
Residents of Kinondoni receive their water primarily from the Lower and Upper Ruvu, which are overseen by the Dar es Salaam Water and Sewerage Authority (DAWASA).81% of the water used daily comes from DAWASA systems, with the other 45% coming from deep wells that are both privately and collectively owned. The water scheme owned by the municipality and run by the water committee and community-owned water supply organizations (COWSOs) in Kinondoni Municipal Council has 123 boreholes, and 366 water points, and involves approximately 400 privately owned boreholes.

According to Water Policy (2012), only 81% of the estimated 1,134,211 residents of Kinondoni Municipality have direct access to clean and safe water within 400 meters, while the remaining 19% have no direct access.

==== Sanitation ====
According to the 2018 solid waste generation predictions, Kinondoni municipality is anticipated to generate roughly 1,223.6 tons of garbage per day or 446,614 tonnes per year. Currently, the Municipal Council and the private sectors handle solid waste transportation. The municipal council has about ten trucks for moving solid trash from various municipal locations to the current disposal site, which is located about 35 kilometers from Kinondoni's center and requires a round-trip distance of about 70 kilometers. Contractors, community organizations, and non-profits are among the private sector entities that possess additional trucks.

Between 1948 and 1950, most of Dar es Salaam's public sewage facilities were built. The sole sewer system built after independence (1961) was the Mikocheni sewer system, which was built in 1976. Due to poor construction, the Mikocheni public sewer is likewise in bad condition. Typically, Dar es Salaam's public sewer is older than 48 years. 7% of the people in Dar es Salaam have access to these sewers. The remaining residents (93%) use on-site sanitation facilities such as pit latrines and septic tank systems. The Kinondoni Municipal Council and the commercial sector both provide cesspit emptying services.

=== Agriculture ===
Kinondoni being one of the most urbanized districts in the country, only 0.18% of the total yearly food requirement is met by the 466.74 tons of food crops that agriculture produces for the Municipality. The actual amount of food consumed is 255,064.38 tons, but there are no food shortages because food crops are grown in areas outside of the Dar es Salaam Region like the Pwani Region, which is a major food production region. Kinondini does still have urban farmers that grow vegetables like matembele (Sweet potato leaves), spices, fruit, coconuts and ornamental plants for both food and income. The district is home to several local food markets, and even a school, the Malolo Agricultural Training Center.

==== Fishing ====
The Kinondoni Municipal Council has a coastline (including islands) that stretches along the Indian Ocean for around 143 kilometers. There are around 2,978 fishermen and 501 fishing boats in total. 3,995.86 tonnes of fish are thought to be caught annually. There are approximately six (6) landing sites, but only three of them—Msasani, Kunduchi, and Ununio—are protected. About six (6) Beach Management Units (BMUs) are present. Msasani, Kawe, Mbweni, Maputo, Kunduchi, and Ununio are among them. Additionally, the Municipality is home to around seven fishing associations in Msasani, Kunduchi, Kawe Ununio, and Mbweni.

There are about 60 fish ponds here. Freshwater fish like Oreochromis Niloticus and catfish (Clarias gariepinus) are the two most often farmed fish species. There are roughly 120 fish butchers spread throughout Kinondoni's many neighborhoods. 22 fisheries stakeholders are additionally involved in the export and import of fisheries goods. The most frequently imported species include tilapia and catfish, and the most often exported species include octopus, squid, and crustaceans (crabs, prawns, and lobsters).

=== Industry and trade ===
The National Bank of Commerce (NBC), National Micro Finance Bank (NMB), Tanzania Postal Bank, Akiba Commercial Bank, Access Bank, Azania Bank, and Efatha Bank Ltd. are the main financial institutions with services in the Municipality. Some loan facilities established by the Kinondoni Municipal Council are geared toward women and young people. These include the Women Development Funds (WDF), the Village Community Bank (VICOBA), and the Kinondoni Youth Employment Network for Urban Renewal (K-YEN-UR). Both individuals and groups are given the credits.

One of the Municipal Councils in the city draws a lot of immigrants from poorer regions like Mtwara Region and Kigoma Region who come to Kinondoni in quest of work and trading opportunities. Due to the lack of employment prospects, the majority of these people engage in petty trade, primarily with vendors of fresh and dry foods, secondhand clothing, bags, shoes, and produce. They operate outside the laws and health norms of the Kinondoni Municipal Council on the pavements of buildings along the sides of the road, as well as in unauthorized stalls and kiosks.

According to the Kinondoni Municipality's informal sector survey from 1995 to 1996, there were 325,869 persons working there. In 2000/2001, one out of every three households participated in an activity in the unofficial sector, compared to one out of every four households in 1990/1991. Additionally, it revealed that 61 percent of all households in metropolitan areas work in the informal sector, up from 42 percent in the years 1990–1991.

=== Tourism ===
The Pande Forest, which was designated a forest reserve in the 1950s, is one of the roughly 1,226.742 Hectares of natural vegetation in the Kinondoni local council. The location is 15 kilometers off Bagamoyo Road. In the 1990s, it was transformed into Pande Game Reserve. Numerous wild animal species, including monkeys, birds, and others, can be found in the forest. Numerous small towns, including Mpiji Magohe, Mpopo, Mabwepande, and Msumi, surround the forest. The mangrove forest surrounding the river estuaries and the beach of the Indian Ocean offers the city an ecology, and its greenery offers good scenery and tourist attractions like the Dar es Salaam Marine Reserve's islands.

== Population ==
The original inhabitants of Kinondoni District were the Zaramo and Ndengereko minority, but due to recent urbanization the district has become one of the most multi-ethnic in Tanzania. The 2002 Tanzanian National Census showed that the population of Kinondoni was 1,083,913. The census of 2012 showed that the population of Kinondoni was 1,775,049: 914,247 female and 860,802 male. There are 446,504 households in Kinondoni with an average of 4 people per household. In 2012, 2,896 people were living there per square kilometer. By 2018, that number is expected to rise to 3,881 per square kilometer. 68.3% of Tandale and Kigogo residents who make up 6% of the Municipal population overall are forced to live in unplanned areas. Mabwepande makes up 3% of the Municipal population, whereas Mbweni Ward has 1% of it.

== Health and Education ==
=== Education ===
There are 161 pre-primary schools in Kinondoni Municipal Council, of which 78 are owned by the government and 83 by the private sector. Municipal also contains 163 primary schools, of which 79 are owned by the government and 84 by the private sector. From Pre-Primary to Primary Level, there are 86,672 students enrolled in all 77 Government Primary Schools, together with 1975 teachers. There are also 34,170 students enrolled in private schools.

There are currently 83 secondary schools in the Municipal Council, of which 26 are registered community secondary schools and 57 are privately operated. Additionally, by July 2019, the first form V will be enrolled in 2 out of 27 community schools and 20 out of 57 private secondary schools that are at an Advanced Level. 25 Community Secondary Schools combined had 25,305 students in grades I through IV and 944 teachers. 13,990 students in grades I through VI are enrolled in private schools, together with 2,116 teachers. The Open University of Tanzania, The Hubert Kairuki Memorial University, The International Medical and Technological University (IMTU), Tumaini University, Ardhi University and The EASTC are all located in Kinondoni.

=== Health ===
There are currently 188 health institutions in the council, 27 of which are held by the government. The other 161 are privately operated. The largest hospital is the Kinondoni Municipal Hospital in Mabwepande. Kunduchi and Wazo both have 3 public health centers making them have the most in the district. Magomeni, Makumbusho, and Kinondoni have no Public health centers as of 2018.

== Arts, sports, film and culture ==
There are over 350 registered arts organizations, which include performing arts like choirs, jazz bands, brass bands, Bongo Flava, traditional dance, and drama as well as fine arts like handicraft, painting, and sculpture. There are approximately 98 film producers/dealers and everyone working in the film industry needs to apply for a permit from the Municipal Censorship Board, Regional Censorship Board, or Central Censorship Board.

There are five sports organizations and roughly 256 sports clubs. The majority of local clubs that participate in regular practice sessions, local matches, or competitions are football and jogging clubs. Favorite football teams include Green Warriors 94 kJ FC (First Division League), Ukwamani FC, Kumbukumbu FC, Red Coast FC, Mbudya FC, Bira FC, New Life FC, and Kijitonyama FC (Third Division League), as well as Kinondoni Municipal Council Football Club (KMC-FC), which has qualified to compete in Tanzania Vodacom Premier League 2018/19. The Kinondoni Football Association (KIFA), Kinondoni Netball Association (CHANEKI), Kinondoni Jogging Association (KIJA), Kinondoni District Basketball Association, and Kinondoni District Referees Association are the five sporting organizations.

== Notable persons from Kinondoni District ==
- Henry Rimisho, Architect
- Diamond Platnumz, Musical artist grew up in Tandale ward.
