= Tumaini University Dar es Salaam College =

Coordinates: 6°47′14″S 39°15′38″E

Dar es Salaam Tumaini University
- Swahili: Chuo Kikuu cha Tumaini Dar es Salaam
- Former names: Tumaini University Makumira
- Type: Private
- Established: 2007; 19 years ago
- Affiliations: Lutheran
- Vice-Chancellor: Prof. Burton L.M. Mwamila
- Students: 4,200 (2025/26)
- Location: Dar es Salaam, Dar es Salaam Region, Tanzania
- Campus: Urban
- Website: dartu.ac.tz

Dar es Salaam Tumaini University was formerly known as Tumaini University Dar es Salaam College (TUMADARCo), a constituent college of Tumaini University Makumira. In 2024, it attained full registration as an independent university and became the current Dar es Salaam Tumaini University. The university is located in Mikocheni Ward, Kinondoni District, in Dar es Salaam Region, Tanzania.
