= Ubungo II Thermal Power Station =

Power station in Tanzania

- Map of Tanzania showing the location of Ubungo Thermal Power Station
- Official name: Ubungo II Thermal Power Station
- Country: Tanzania
- Location: Ubungo, Ubungo District , Dar es Salaam Region, Tanzania.
- Coordinates: 6°47′40″S 39°12′30.5″E
- Status: Operational
- Construction began: 2011
- Commission date: 2012
- Owner: TANESCO
- Operator: Tanzania Electric Supply Co.

Thermal power station
- Primary fuel: Natural gas

Power generation
- Units operational: 3 x 34 MW
- Make and model: Siemens GT-1 SGT-800 (Gas)
- Nameplate capacity: 100 MW

External links
- Website: Tanesco website

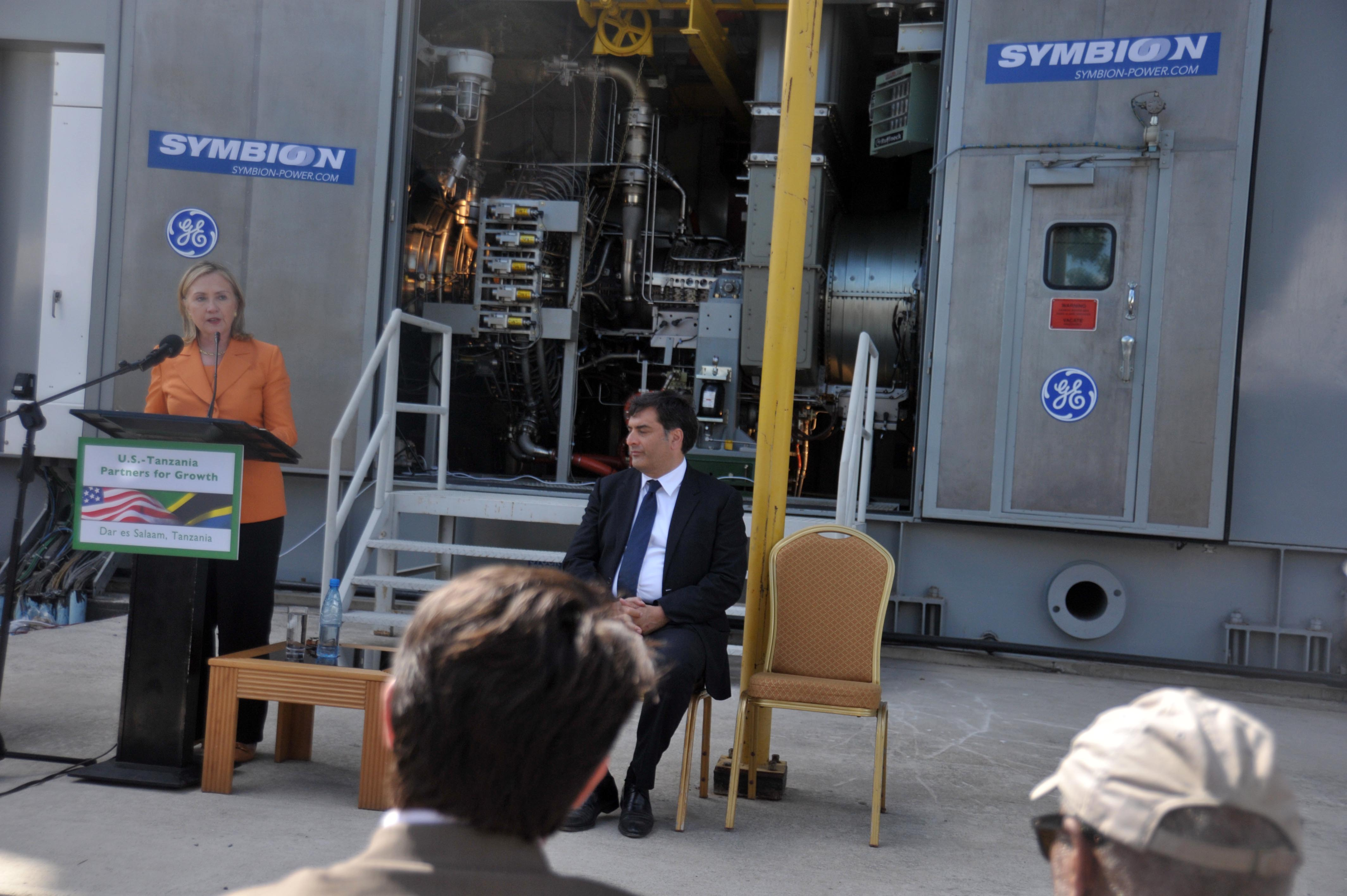
Secretary Clinton Delivers Remarks at the Ubungo Power Plant in Tanzania

Ubungo II Thermal Power Station was an extension to the Ubungo I Power Station and began commercial operations in 2012. The power-plant is located in Ubungo of Ubungo District in Dar es Salaam Region of Tanzania. The plant has an installed capacity of 100 megawatts (130,000 hp).

== History ==
Symbion Power already had extensive electrification contracts within Tanzania. Symbion helped build a power plant in May 2011 and was operational in under one month. The introduction of the Symbion Power Plant to the Tanzanian electricity helped alleviate the problems experienced in the country caused by severe power shedding. Symbion's projects were funded by the Government of the United States through the Millennium Challenge Corporation.

The Power plant was handed over to the Tanzania Electric Supply Company in June 2011 and TANESCO planned to convert the current power plant to a permanent facility. TANESCO awarded Jacobsen Elektro AS from Norway to construct the Ubungo II Gas Based Power Plant. Jacobsen ordered three SGT-800 gas turbines from Siemens with a total capacity of 100 megawatts (130,000 hp).

The Ubungo II Gas Based Power Plant was constructed in 14 months and began operations on 1 July 2012. Unlike the Ubungo I plant, this plant is owned and operated entirely by TANESCO. However the gas for this plant is still obtained by Songas.

== See also ==
- Ubungo I Thermal Power Station
- Tanzania Electric Supply Company Limited (TANESCO)
- List of power stations in Tanzania
- Economy of Tanzania
