= Kinyerezi =

Ward of Ilala District, Dar es Salaam Region

Kinyerezi Kata ya Kinyerezi (Swahili)
- Ward of Ilala District
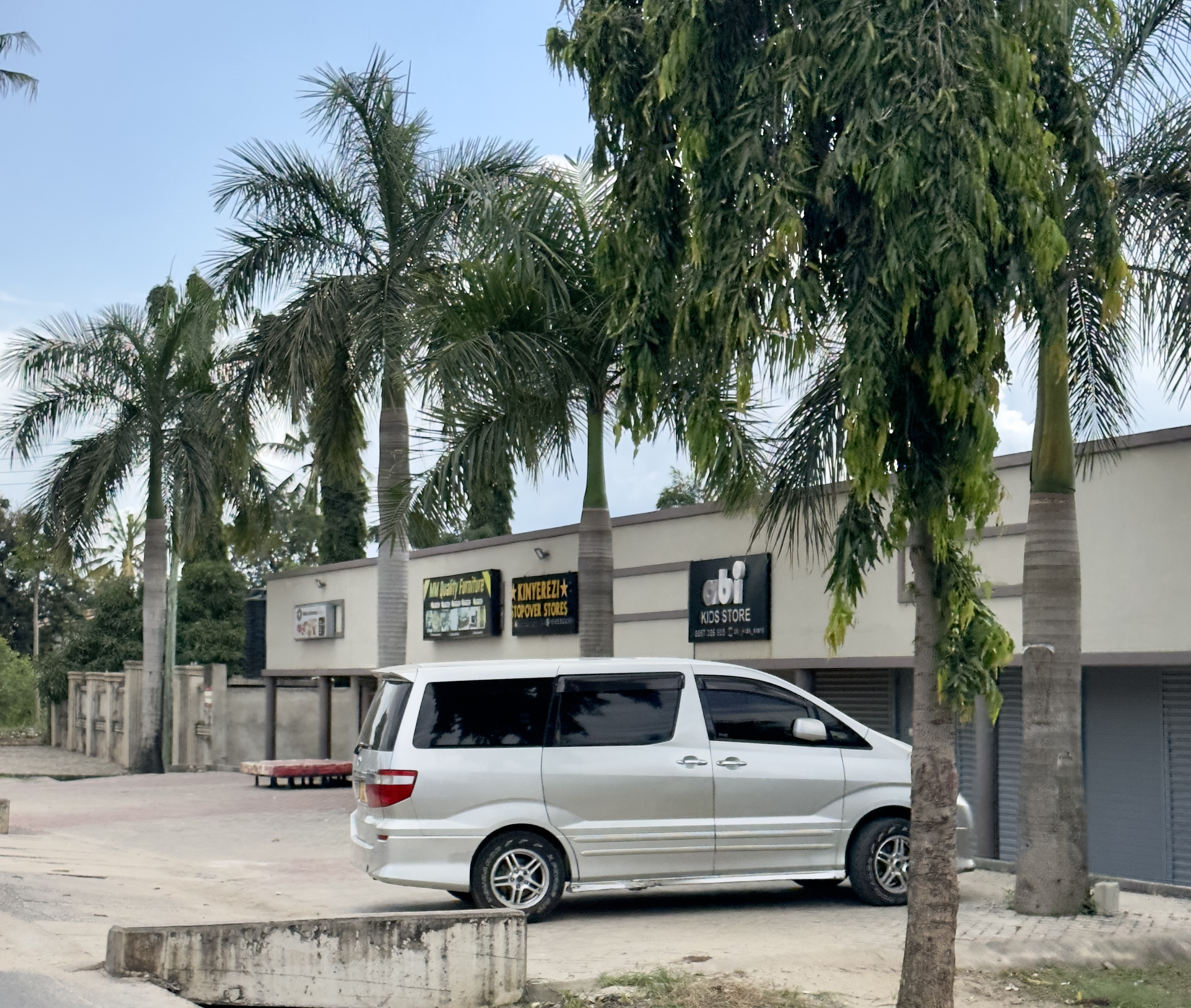
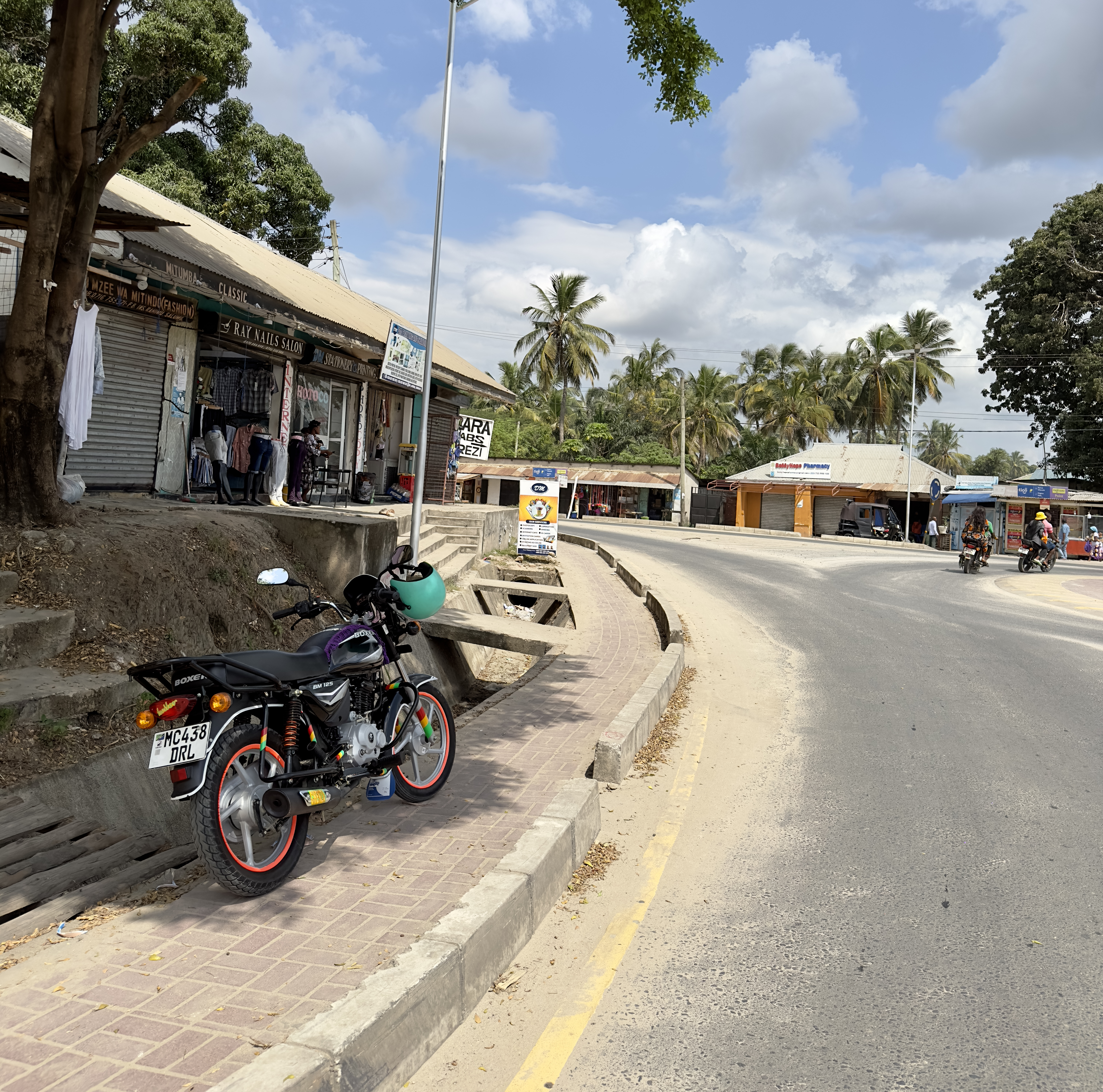
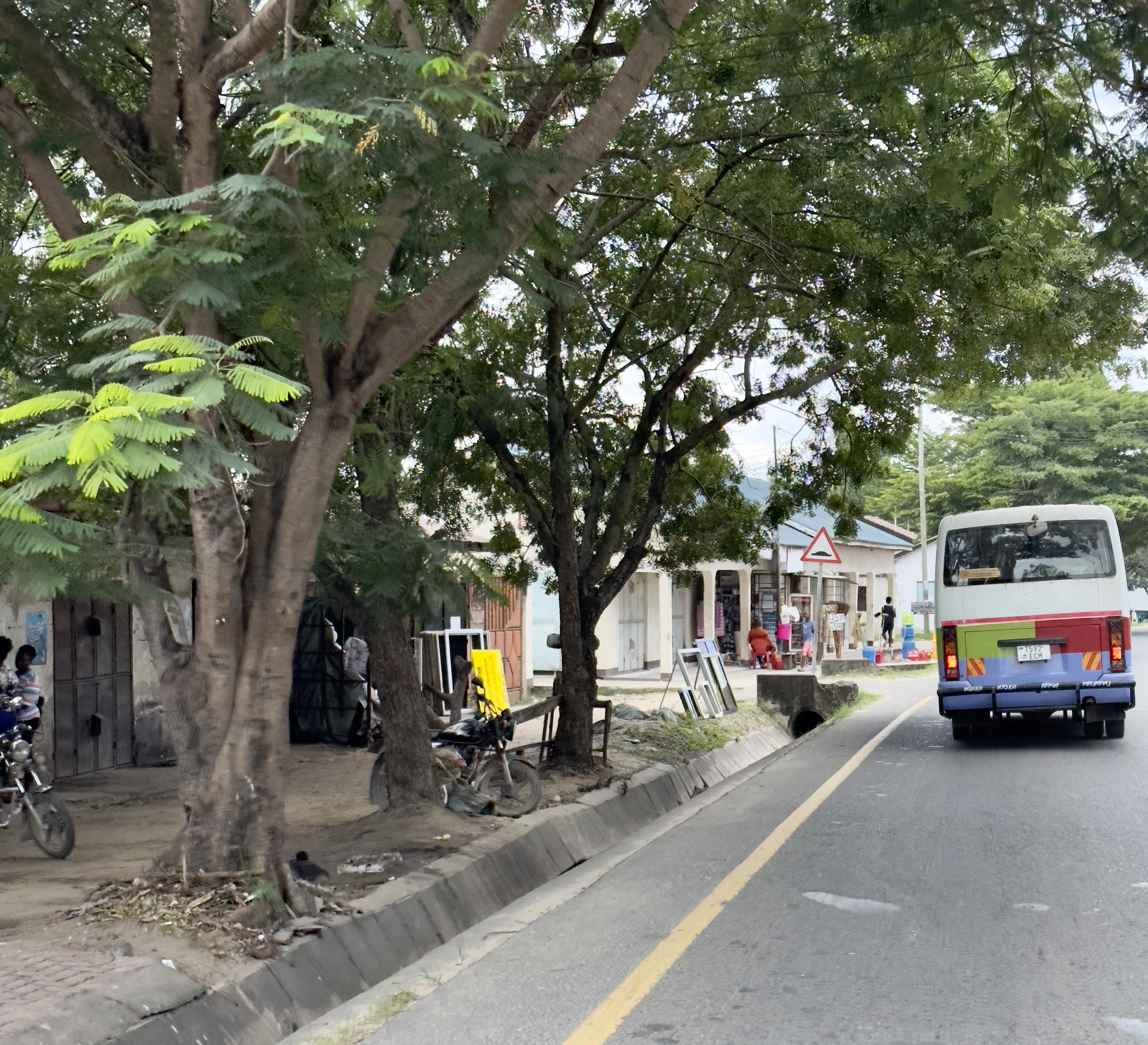
- From top to bottom: Street in Kinyerezi ward, Road through KInyerezi ward, Shaded street in Kinyerezi
- Interactive map of Kinyerezi
- Coordinates: 6°51′6.12″S 39°9′34.56″E
- Country: Tanzania
- Region: Dar es Salaam Region
- District: Ilala District

Area
  - Total: 21.2 km^{2} (8.2 sq mi)

Population (2022)
  - Total: 62,480

Ethnic groups
  - Settler: Swahili
  - Ancestral: Zaramo
- Tanzanian Postal Code: 12116

Kinyerezi (Kata ya Kinyerezi, in Swahili) is an administrative ward of the Ilala Municipal Council of the Dar es Salaam Region in Tanzania. The wards of Kinondoni MC are bordered to the north by Msigani, Saranga, and Kimara wards of Ubungo MC. The ward is bordered to the east by the wards of Segerea and Kimanga. Kipawa, Ukonga, Gongolamboto, and Pugu are to the south. The ward is bordered by Kwembe to the west. According to the 2022 census, the ward has a total population of 62,480.

== Administration ==
The postal code for the Kinyerezi ward is 12116. The ward is divided into the following neighborhoods (Mitaa):

- Kanga
- Kibanga
- Kichangani

- Kifuru
- Kinyerezi
- Kwalimbaga

=== Government ===
The ward, like every other ward in the country, has local government offices based on the population served.The Kinyerezi Ward administration building houses a court as per the Ward Tribunal Act of 1988, including other vital departments for the administration the ward. The ward has the following administration offices:

- Kinyerezi Police Station
- Kinyerezi Government Office (Afisa Mtendaji)
- Kinyerezi Ward Tribunal (Baraza La Kata) is a Department inside Ward Government Office

In the local government system of Tanzania, the ward is the smallest democratic unit. Each ward is composed of a committee of eight elected council members which include a chairperson, one salaried officer (with no voting rights), and an executive officer. One-third of seats are reserved for women councillors.

== Demographics ==
The ward serves as the Zaramo people's ancestral home, along with much of the district. As the city developed throughout time, the ward became into a cosmopolitan ward. In total, 62,480 people called the ward home in 2022.

== Education and health ==
=== Education ===
The ward is home to these educational institutions

- Kinyerezi Mpya Secondary School
- Ari Secondary School
- Kinyerezi Secondary School
- Bonyokwa Secondary School
- Midway Secondary School
- Muhanga Secondary School

=== Healthcare ===
The ward is home to the following health institutions:

- CCP medicine Hospital
- Nyumbani Specialized Clinic, Kinyerezi
- Maria Clinic
