= Bravo Group Limited =

Tanzanian logistics company

- Industry: Logistics
- Founded: 2005
- Founder: Angelina Ngalula
- Headquarters: Dar es Salaam, Tanzania
- Services: Road freight, rail freight and inland container depot operations
- Website: bravo.co.tz

Bravo Group Limited is a Tanzanian logistics company headquartered in Dar es Salaam. The business was founded by Angelina Ngalula in 2005, started its operation in 2006 with one truck, according to a profile maintained by the Association of Tanzania Employers. It carries out road freight, rail cargo transport and inland container depot operations. The company signed a deal with Tanzania-Zambia Railway Authority (TAZARA) in 2024, launching cargo operations between the Port of Dar es Salaam and Zambia and the Democratic Republic of the Congo.

== History ==
Bravo Group limited was founded in 2005 by Angelina Ngalula with operations starting in 2006 as started by the Association of Tanzania Employers. In 2018, the vice chairperson of the Tanzania Private Sector Foundation, Angelina Ngalula, is identified as the founder of Bravo Logistics.

In March 2024, Bravo Group Limited signed an open cargo-haulage contract with TAZARA. The deal initially valued at approximately $35 million and Bravo Group Limited bought two locomotives and 40 wagons to be used in transpoting cargo between Dar es Salaam, Zambia and Democratic Republic of Congo. Ngalula explained that the necessary tender had been won two years earlier but had to be postponed due to the state of the railway infrastructure.

By June 2026, Bravo Logistics was operating the Ubungo Dry Port in Dar es Salaam. During the meetings with Central Corridor member states, representative visited the facility regarding inland container depots, rail infrastructure and cargo congestion at the Port of Dar es Salaam. Ngalula said the company was thinking of building mre facilities, such as a truck holding site in kiluvywa, during the visit.

== Operations ==
Businesses are involved in logistics and agriculture operations and are part of Bravo Group. As chief executive Alex Duffar explained in an interview in 2021, the company's activities reach all corners of logistics, agriculture and health and safety.“From logistics and agriculture through to health and safety, we do everything we can,” said Alex Duffar, chief executive of the company, in an interview in 2021. The company, in 2024, planned to deliver goods to Zambia and the Democratics Republic of congo from the Port of Dar es Salaam using the acquired locomotives and wagons under the train contracts they had with TAZARA.

Ubungo Dry Port, an inland cargo facility operated by Bravo Logistics, is used in the storage of freight away from the port of Dar es Salaam. The inland container depot at Ubungo was expected to expand beyond copper-stuffing operations so as to handle additional types of cargo.

== Corporate affairs and reception ==
Angelina Ngalula, identified as Bravo Group's chairperson when the TAZARA deal was signed in 2024 and as the founder and managing director of Bravo Logistics on the reporting on the Ubungo facility in 2026 has held senior roles of management and ownership of the company.

There has also been criticism about the effects of the growth on inland container depots in the city of Dar es Salaam on urban transport. In August 2026, raised concerns were reported over ethical, structural, infrastructural and road congestion in the expansion of the Bravo ICD at Ubungo. Tanzanian transport and planning aouthorities were said to be looking at combining evaluations of proposed ICD and dry-port sites in addition to the potential impacts on road capacity and local communities. The company intended to have a truck holding area at Kiluvya where trucks would be parked outside of the highly congested areas of Dar es Salaam before being called to collect cargo, Ngalula said.
