= Msigani =

Ward of Ubungo District, Dar es Salaam Region

Msigani Kata ya Msigani (Swahili)
- Ward of Ubungo District
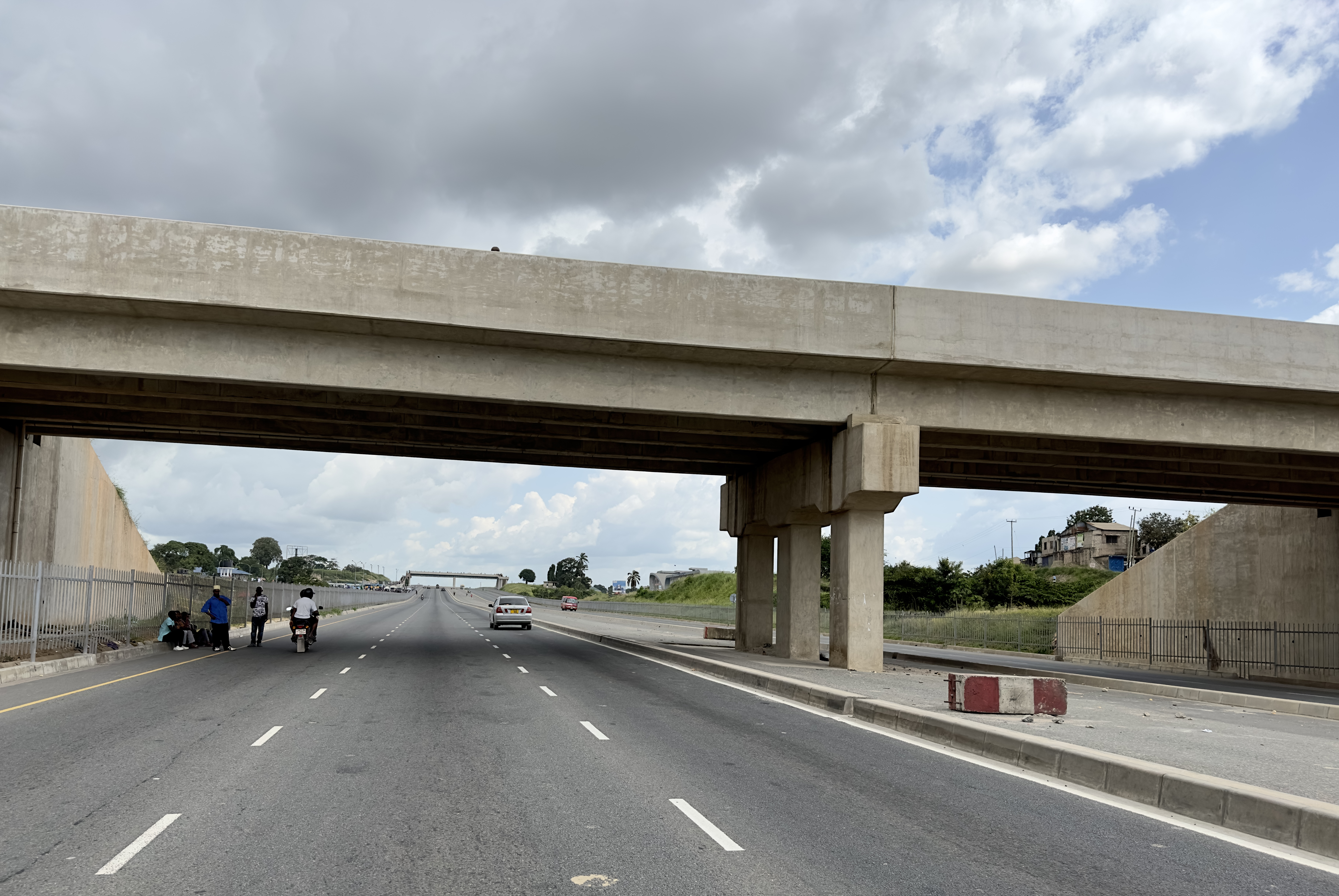
- From top to bottom: T1 highway overpass in Msigani
- Interactive map of Msigani
- Coordinates: 6°48′15.48″S 39°6′43.56″E
- Country: Tanzania
- Region: Dar es Salaam Region
- District: Ubungo District

Area
  - Total: 14.6 km^{2} (5.6 sq mi)

Population (2012)
  - Total: 55,111

Ethnic groups
  - Settler: Swahili
  - Ancestral: Zaramo
- Tanzanian Postal Code: 16114

Msigani (Kata ya Msigani, in Swahili) is an administrative ward in Ubungo District of the Dar es Salaam Region in Tanzania. Mbezi forms the northern boundary of the ward. The ward is bordered with Saranga to the east. The Kinyerezi ward of Ilala MC is to the south. Kwembe is to the west. According to the 2012 census, the ward has a total population of 34,123.

== Administration ==
The postal code for Msigani Ward is 16114. The ward is divided into the following neighborhoods (Mitaa):

- Kwa Yusuph
- Mlamba Mawili
- Msigani

- Msingwa
- Temboni

=== Government ===
Like every other ward in the country, the ward has local government offices based on the population served. The Msigani Ward administration building houses a court as per the Ward Tribunal Act of 1988, including other vital departments for the administration of the ward. The ward has the following administration offices:

- Msigani Police Station
- Msigani Government Office (Afisa Mtendaji)
- Msigani Ward Tribunal (Baraza La Kata) is a Department inside Ward Government Office

In the local government system of Tanzania, the ward is the smallest democratic unit. Each ward comprises a committee of eight elected council members, including a chairperson, one salaried officer (with no voting rights), and an executive officer. One-third of seats are reserved for women councilors.

== Demographics ==
The ward serves as the Zaramo's ancestral home along with a sizable chunk of the district. The ward changed over time into a cosmopolitan ward as the city grew.

== Education and health ==
=== Education ===
The ward is home to these educational institutions:

- Msingwa Primary School
- Msigani Primary School
- Malamba Mawili Primary School
- Bwawani Primary School
- Mount Sayuni Primary School
- Carmelite Secondary School
- Temboni Secondary School

=== Healthcare ===
The ward is home to the following health institutions:

- Afyacare Charitable Health Center
- Malamba Mawili Health Center
- Kipasika Health Center
- Luguruni Health Center
