= St. Joseph University In Tanzania =

Private University in Tanzania

Coordinates: 6°47′31″S 39°5′19″E

- Chuo Kikuu cha Mtakatifu Joseph Nchini Tanzania (Swahili)
- Type: Private
- Established: 2011; 15 years ago
- Affiliations: Catholic Church
- Chancellor: Rev. Fr. J. E. Arulraj
- President: Dr. T. X. A. Ananth
- Vice-Chancellor: Prof. Eliab Z. Opiyo
- Location: Mbezi, Dar es Salaam, Tanzania
- Campus: Urban
- Website: sjuit.ac.tz

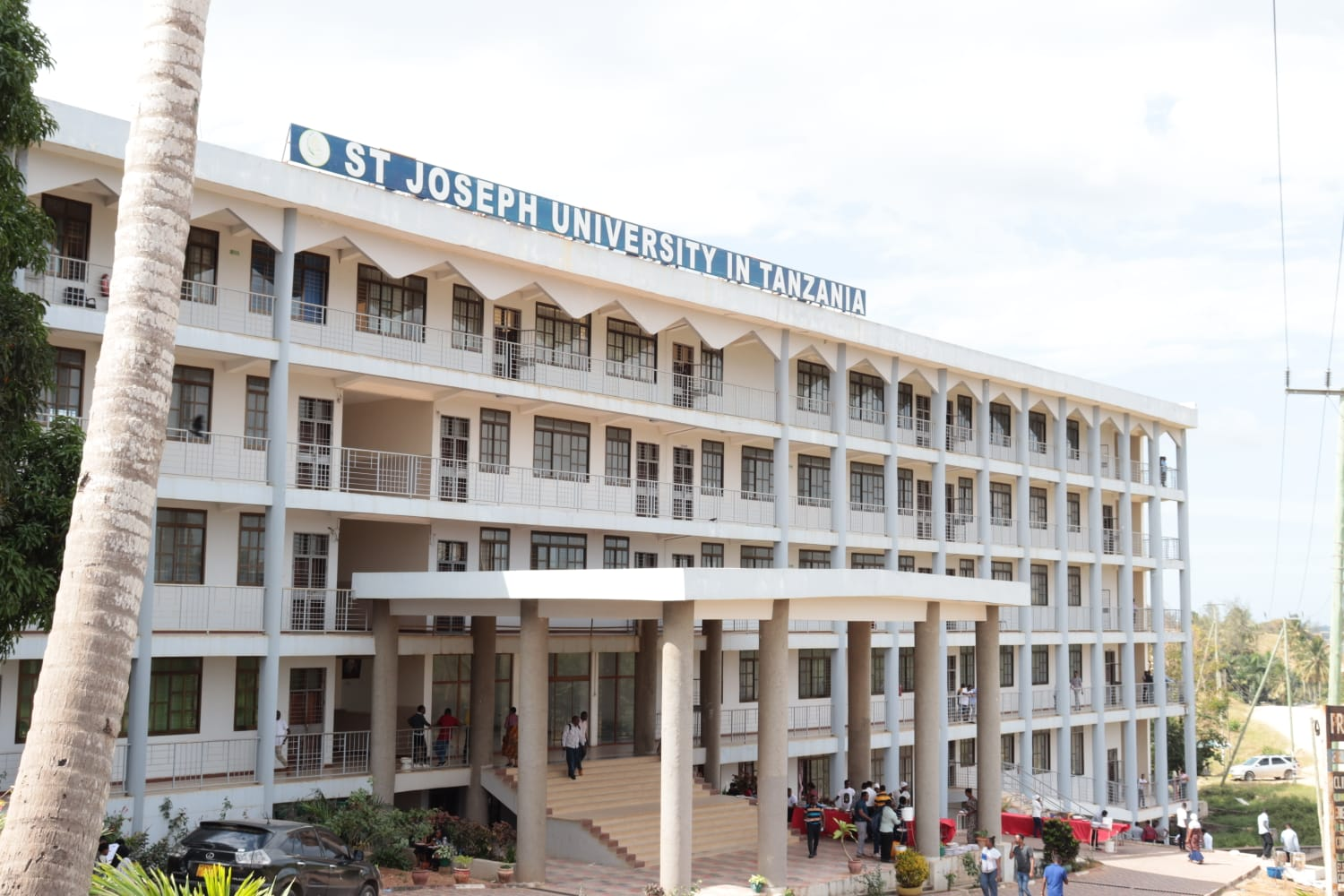
St. Joseph University In Tanzania - Administration Building at Mbezi Luguruni Campus, Dar es Salaam

St. Joseph University In Tanzania (SJUIT) is a private university in Tanzania. The university has two campuses at Mbezi Luguruni, Ubungo District and Boko Dovya Kinondoni District in Dar es Salaam, Tanzania. The main campus is at Mbezi Luguruni, Dar es Salaam.

The university has two Colleges: the St. Joseph College of Engineering and Technology (SJCET) at Mbezi Luguruni Main Campus and the St. Joseph College of Health and Allied Sciences (SJCHAS) at its Boko Dovya Campus.

The university offers degree programmes in several disciplines, including Bachelor of Science in Civil Engineering, Mechanical Engineering, Electrical and Electronics Engineering, Electronics and Communication Engineering, Computer Science Engineering, Information Systems and Networking Engineering, Bachelor of Science in Mechatronics Engineering,Bachelor of Science in Artificial Intelligence and Machine Learning, Bachelor of Science in Quantity Surveying, Bachelor of Science in Electronics and Computer Engineering, Doctor of Medicine (MD), Bachelor of Science in Computer Science, and Bachelor of Science with Education (Physics, Chemistry, Mathematics, Biology, Geography, Computer Science).

Furthermore, the University offers postgraduate programmes leading to the award of the Master of Engineering in Mechatronics Engineering, Master of Science in Power Electronics and Electrical Drives, Master of Science in Renewable Energy Engineering, and Master of Business Administration (MBA).

The university also offers diploma and certificate programmes in Civil Engineering, Mechanical Engineering, Electrical and Electronics Engineering, Electronics and Telecommunication Engineering, Computer Science Engineering, Information Technology, Mechatronics Engineering, Industrial and Manufacturing Engineering, Pharmaceutical Sciences and Nursing and Midwifery.
