= Pande Game Reserve =

Protected Area

- IUCN category IV (habitat/species management area)
- Location within Tanzania
- Location: Kinondoni & Ubungo Districts of Dar es Salaam Region, Tanzania
- Nearest city: Dar es Salaam
- Coordinates: 6°41′10.32″S 39°4′51.6″E
- Area: 15.39 km^{2} (5.94 mi^{2})
- Created: 1952
- Established: 1990
- Administrator: Tanzania Wildlife Management Authority (TAWA)
- Website: Official Page

The Pande Game Reserve (Hifadhi ya Akiba ya Pande, In Swahili) is a protected area located in Mabwepande ward of Kinondoni District and Mbezi ward of Ubungo District in Dar es Salaam Region of Tanzania that covers an area of 15.39 km^{2} (5.94 sq mi). It was established as a Forest Reserve in 1952 under the British colonial occupation.

The reserve is located entirely inside the region of Dar es Salaam, making it the largest land protected area in the urbanized region. with and is bordered by five villages: Msumi, Msakuzi, Mabwepande, Mpiji Magoe, and Mbopo. It is located 80 m to 186 m above sea level, 45 km northwest of the city center, and 16 km from the Indian Ocean.

== Etymology ==
The Zaramo phrase Mabwe Pande, which translates to "stones of Pande" in English, is the source of the name Pande Game Reserve. It is rumored that cutting stones into little pieces for trade took place inside the Reserve Area a very long time ago. As a result, Mabwe Pande was given to the location where that activity took place.

== Geography ==
The Eastern Arc / Coastal Forest Biodiversity Hotspot, one of the world's top priority regions for biodiversity conservation, includes Pande Game Reserve. The area of Pande closest to the city of Dar es Salaam has also been designated by Birdlife International as an "Important Bird Area". The reserve was first declared a forest reserve in 1952, and in 1990, Government Notice No. 461 upgraded the reserve's conservation status to that of a game reserve. Through this deal, the Tanzania Wildlife Management Authority took over administration of it from the Forest Division.

== Threats ==
According to IUCN threat categories, Pande is home to two endangered, one vulnerable, and four near-threatened animal species. The three taxa that are believed to be strictly unique to Pande—Tricalysia bridsoniana var. pandensis, Shirakiopsis sp. nov., and Leptactina sp. A of FTEA—are among the plants of conservation concern. The bat population in the reserve is very diverse.

An excellent example of an Eastern African Coastal Forest was Pande in the past. The forest has been mined since the 1950s for charcoal, poles, and lumber. The majority of the large trees have been cut down, and the forest area appears to have decreased by about 60%. In other places, large tracts of grass and weeds that are kept in check by periodical fires have taken the place of forests.

As a result, some species within the reserve, including the black-and-white colobus, the plain-backed sunbird, and two absolutely unique plants, look to be on the verge of extinction. Despite the availability of project staff, transportation, and other resources, the reserve continues to deteriorate.
