= Mbezi =

Ward of Ubungo district

Mbezi Kata ya Mbezi (Swahili)
- Ward of Ubungo District
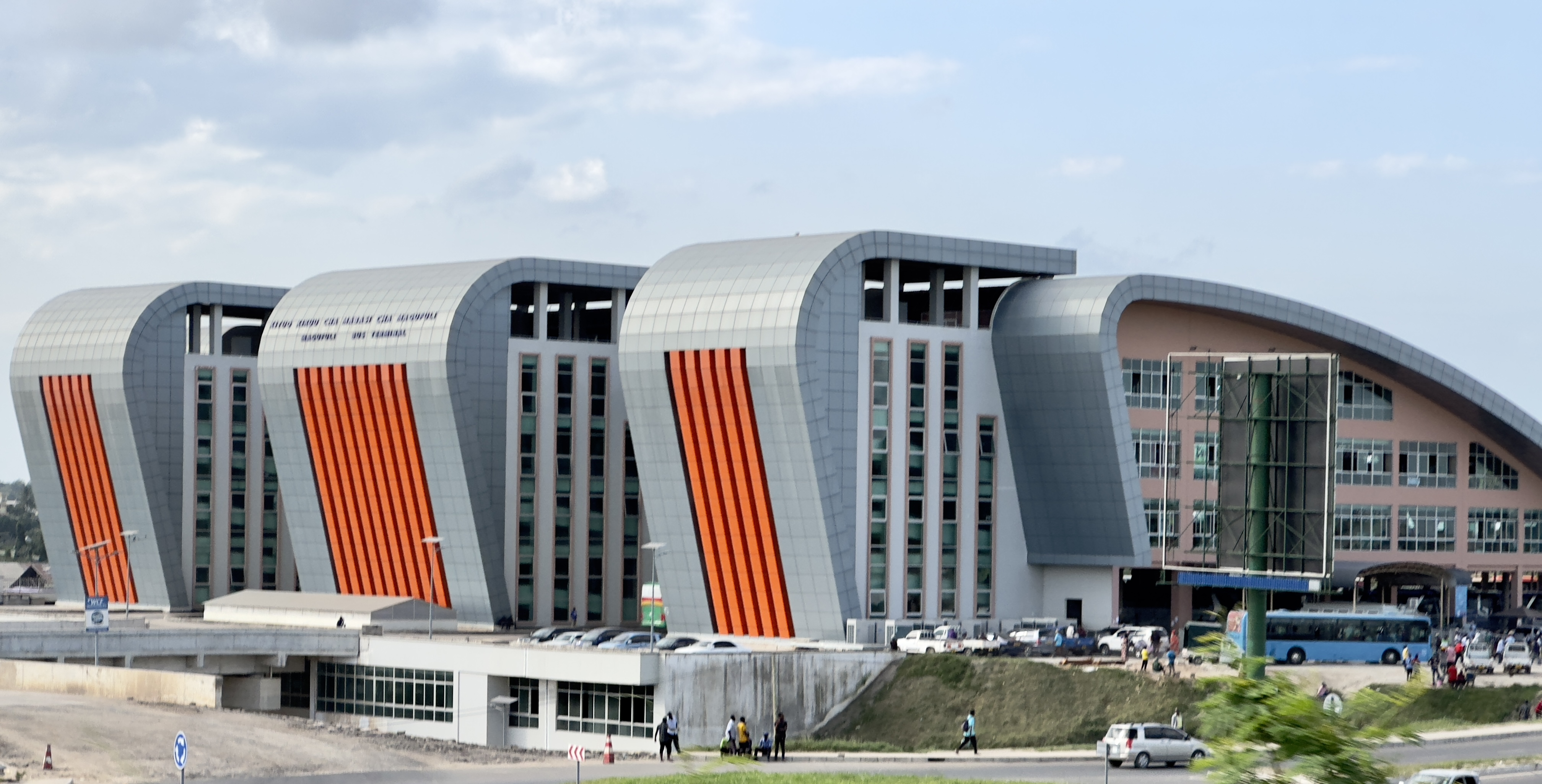
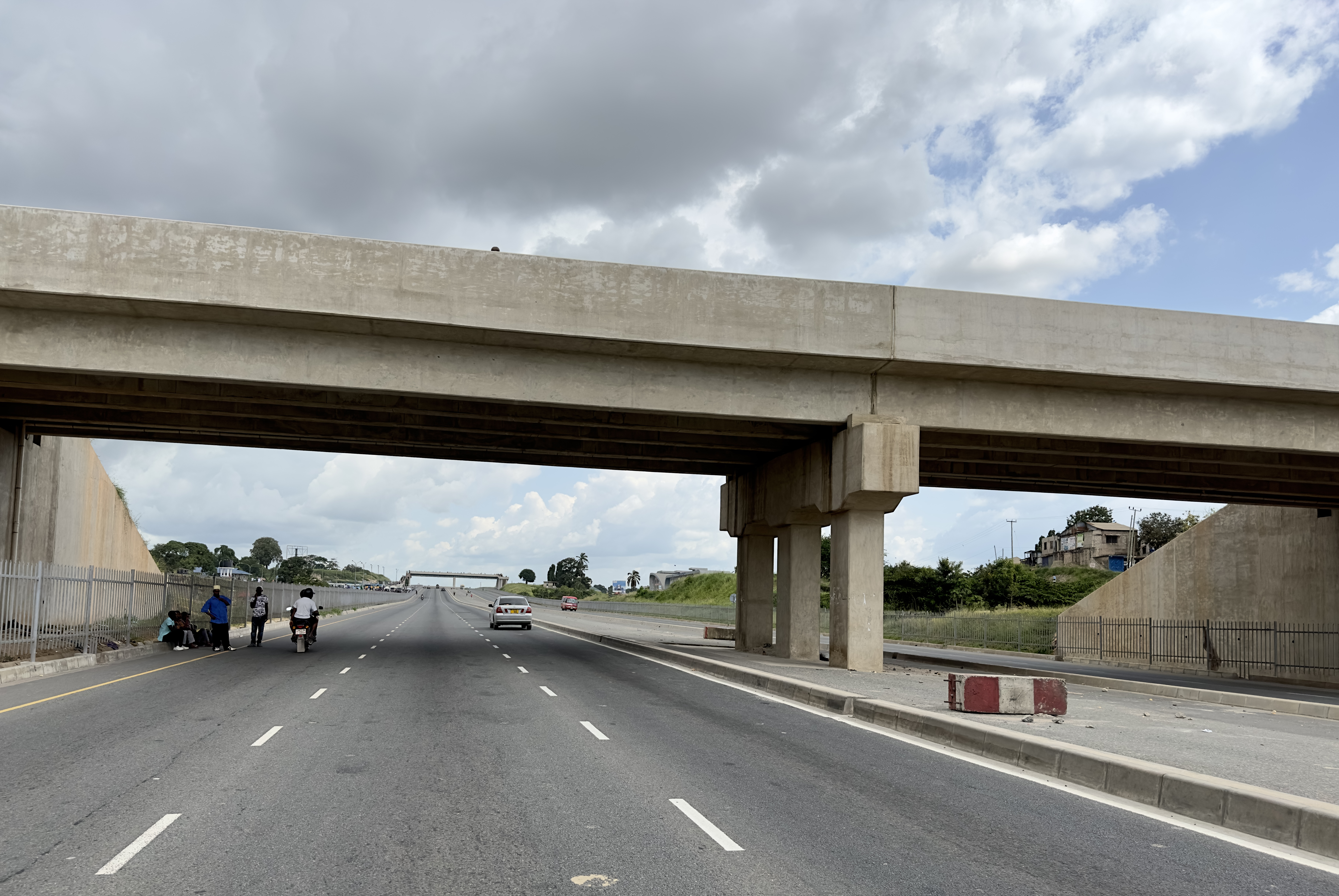
- From top to bottom: Magufuli Bus Terminus in Mbezi & T1 highway bridge on Mbezi border.
- Interactive map of Mbezi
- Coordinates: 6°44′29.4″S 39°05′17.16″E
- Country: Tanzania
- Region: Dar es Salaam Region
- District: Ubungo District

Area
  - Total: 58.2 km^{2} (22.5 sq mi)

Population (2012)
  - Total: 73,414

Ethnic groups
  - Settler: Swahili
  - Ancestral: Zaramo
- Tanzanian Postal Code: 16113

Mbezi (Kata ya Mbezi, in Swahili) is an administrative ward in Ubungo District of the Dar es Salaam Region in Tanzania. Mabwepande and Wazo of Kinondoni MC border the ward to the north. The ward is bordered to the east by the wards of Saranga and Goba. South of here is Msigani. The westernmost wards are Kwembe, Kibamba, Maili Moja, and Pangani, the latter two of Kibaha. The ward is home to the majority of Pande Game Reserve's area. The ward is named after the Mbezi River, which passes through it. According to the 2012 census, the ward has a total population of 73,414.

== Administration ==
The postal code for Mbezi Ward is 16113. The ward is divided into the following neighborhoods (Mitaa):

- Luis
- Makabe
- Mbezi Luis
- Mpiji Magohe

- Msakuzi
- Msakuzi Kusini
- Mshikamano
- Msumi

=== Government ===
Like every other ward in the country, the ward has local government offices based on the population served. The Mbezi Ward administration building houses a court as per the Ward Tribunal Act of 1988, including other vital departments for the administration of the ward. The ward has the following administration offices:

- Mbezi Police Station
- Mbezi Government Office (Afisa Mtendaji)
- Mbezi Ward Tribunal (Baraza La Kata) is a Department inside Ward Government Office

In the local government system of Tanzania, the ward is the smallest democratic unit. Each ward comprises a committee of eight elected council members, including a chairperson, one salaried officer (with no voting rights), and an executive officer. One-third of seats are reserved for women councilors.

== Demographics ==
The ward serves as the Zaramo's ancestral home along with a sizable chunk of the district. The ward changed over time into a cosmopolitan ward as the city grew.

== Education and health ==
=== Education ===
The ward is home to these educational institutions:

- Mbezi Luis Primary School
- Makabe Primary School
- Montesorri Mbezi Mshikamano
- Mbezi Secondary School
- Mbezi Inn Secondary School
- Mbezi Technical School

=== Healthcare ===
The ward is home to the following health institutions:

- Mebzi Health Center
- Mbezi Mazulu Health Center
- Eternal Mbezi Luis Health Center
- Arafa Health Center, Mbez
- Baraka Mbezi Health Center
