= Ubungo I Thermal Power Station =

Power station in Tanzania

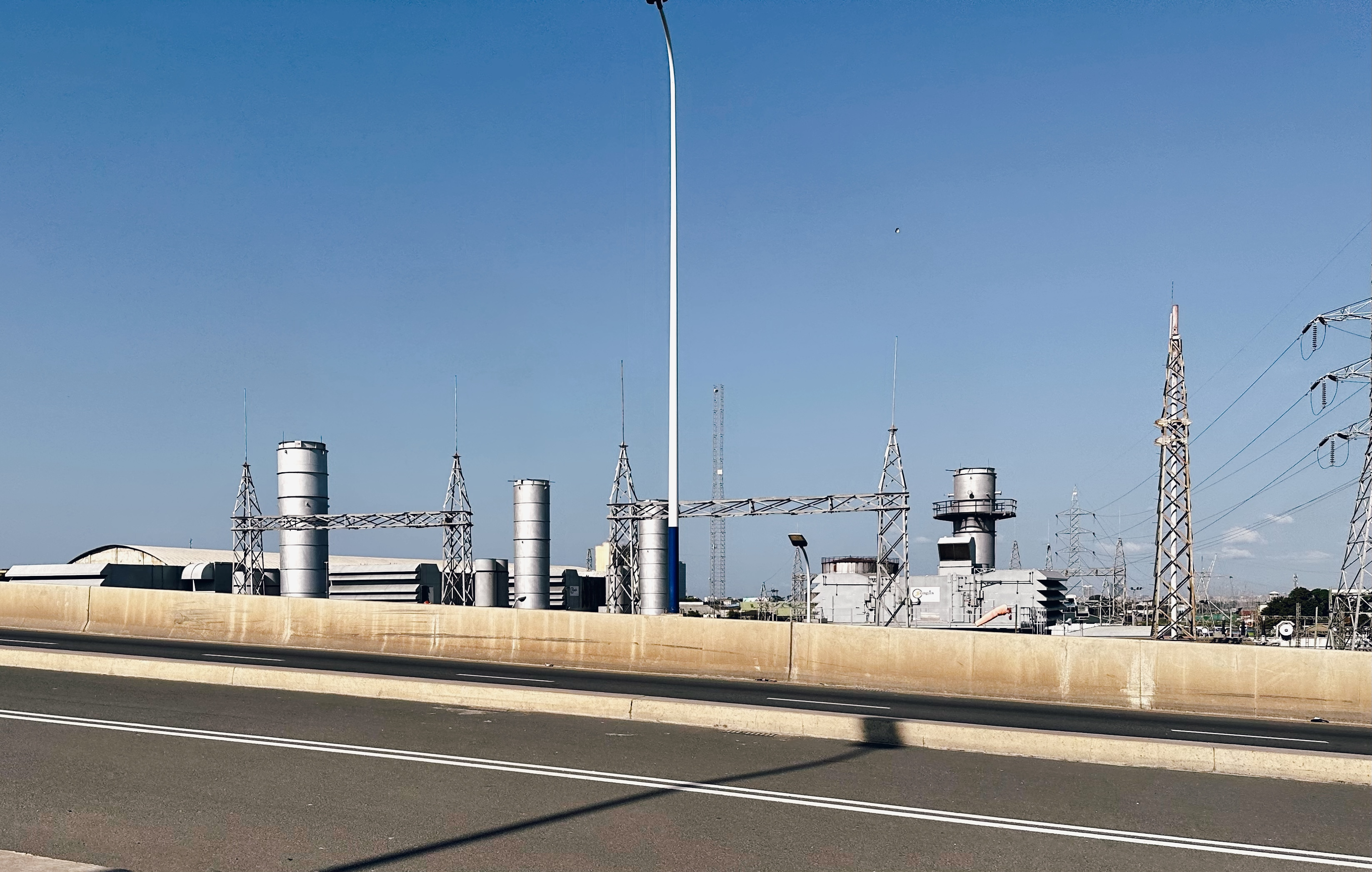
- Ubungo Power Plant, Ubungo MC
- Map of Tanzania showing the location of Ubungo Thermal Power Station
- Official name: Ubungo I Thermal Power Station
- Country: Tanzania
- Location: Ubungo, Ubungo District, Dar es Salaam Region
- Coordinates: 6°47′40″S 39°12′30.5″E
- Status: Operational
- Construction began: 1994
- Commission date: 1995 (Oil); 2008 (Natural Gas)
- Construction cost: US$536 Million (2005)
- Owner: TANESCO
- Operators: Globeleq & Songas

Thermal power station
- Primary fuel: Natural gas
- Secondary fuel: Heavy Oil

Power generation
- Units operational: 2 x 18.5 MW; 2 x 37.5 MW
- Make and model: STAL (Oil); General Electric (Gas)
- Nameplate capacity: 110 MW

External links
- Website: Tanesco website

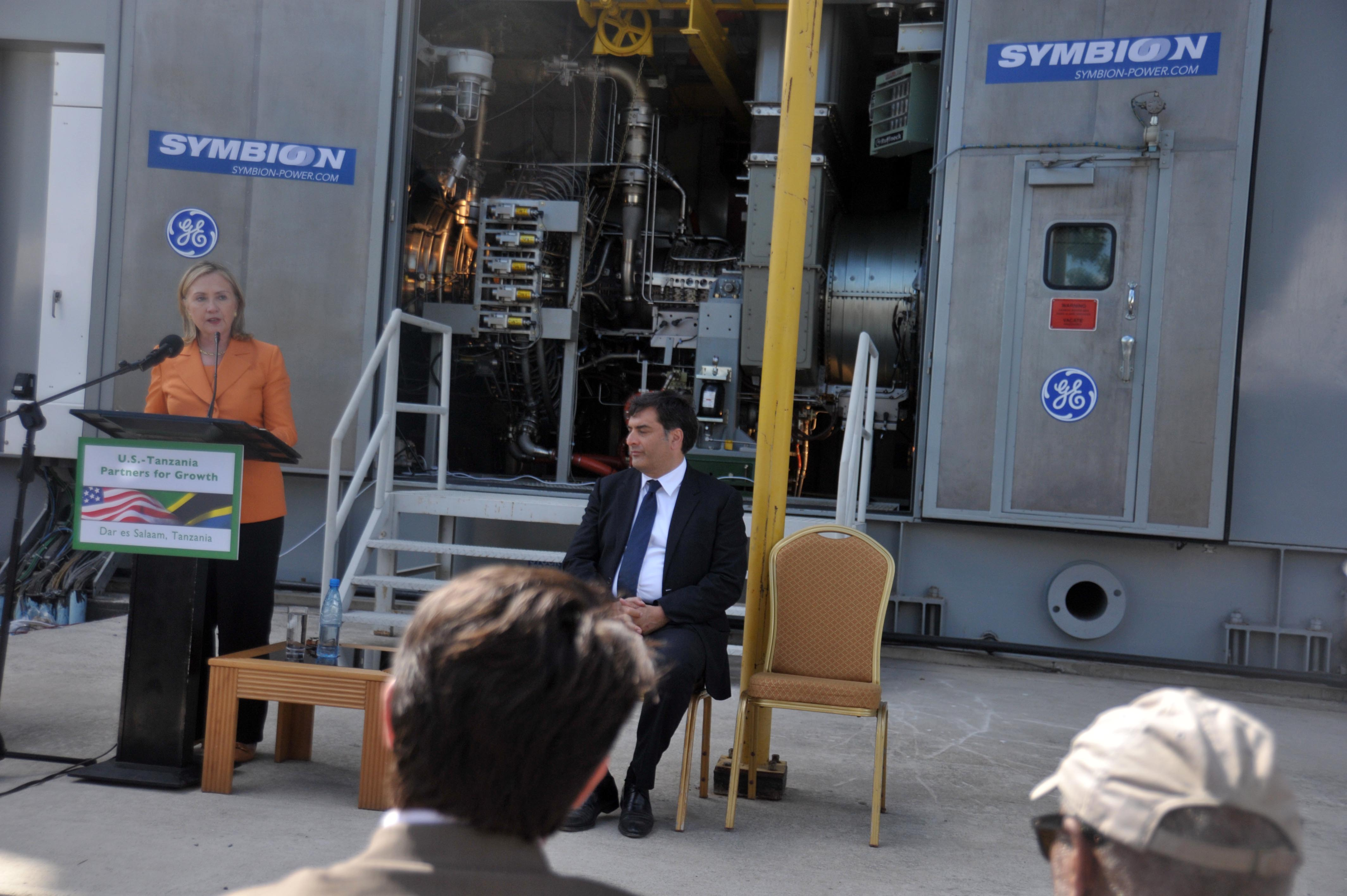
Secretary Clinton Delivers Remarks at the Ubungo Power Plant in Tanzania

Ubungo I Thermal Power Station, also known as the Ubungo Power Plant, is a natural gas-fueled power plant located in Ubungo of Ubungo District in Dar es Salaam Region of Tanzania. It began commercial operations on 30 July 2008 with an installed capacity of 110 megawatts (150,000 hp).

== History ==
The Ubungo plant first opened in 1995 as an oil-burning plant. Tanzania's power supply is heavily dependent on hydro power, and after the drought in 2003–2005, the country faced major energy shortages.

The Tanzania Electric Supply Company decided to upgrade the plant's turbines from heavy oil fuels to natural gas, and planned to obtain gas from the Songo Songo gas fields in southern Tanzania. Songas was given the contract to operate the plant and began commercial operations on 20 July 2004.

Globeleq, Songas's majority shareholder, which operates plants that generate up to 25% of Tanzania's energy, is the Ubungo plant's current operator, and spent US$260 million setting up the Songo Songo gas-power project. Most of this investment went into building a 225 km pipeline from their Songo Songo Island gas fields to Ubungo. The pipeline was completed in May 2004, and the first gas reached Dar es Salaam that July.

== Ubungo II ==
In July 2011, Siemens Energy secured an order from Jacobsen Elektro for three gas turbines to extend the Tanesco Ubungo power plant, also to be fueled from the Songo Songo gas field. Construction took 14 months and the new turbines went online in July 2012, doubling the plant's output.

== See also ==
- Ubungo II Thermal Power Station
- Tanzania Electric Supply Company Limited (TANESCO)
- List of power stations in Tanzania
- Economy of Tanzania
