= Mlimani City =

Mlimani City Shopping Mall
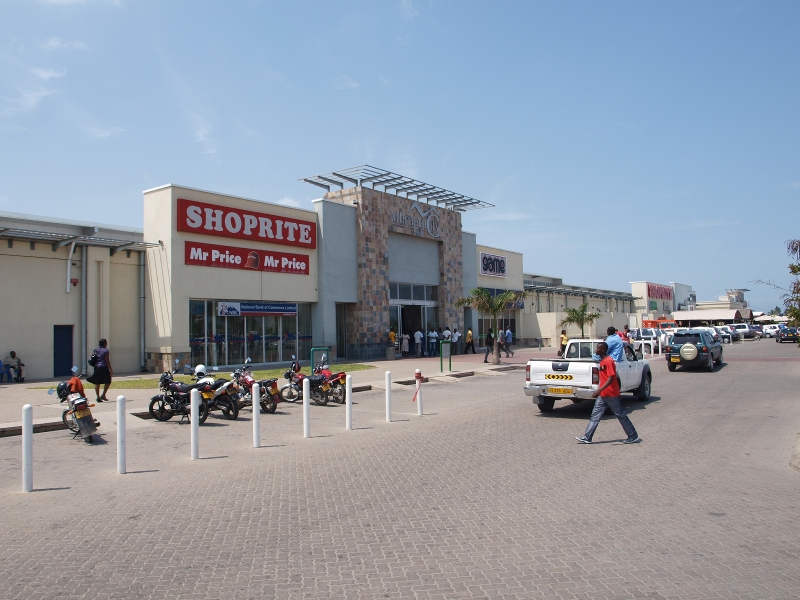
- The southern entrance of Mlimani City shopping mall
- Location: Sam Nujoma Road, Ubungo, Dar es Salaam, Tanzania
- Coordinates: 6°46′21″S 39°13′11″E
- Opened: November 2006
- Floor area: 30,000 m^{2} (320,000 sq ft)
- Website: www.mit.go.tz

Mlimani City is a shopping mall on Sam Nujoma Road, Ubungo, Dar es Salaam, Tanzania. It is one of the largest malls in the country, with an area of 30,000 m^{2} (320,000 sq ft). The opening ceremony was in November 2006. It is Tanzania's first indoor air conditioned mall.

Mlimani City is home to several retail stores, restaurants, and a movie theatre, Century Cinemax. Among the stores are South African and Indian favourite stores like Choppies which is actually local to Botswana and Mr. Price. There are several telecommunication service provider branches based in the mall, like Airtel, Tigo and Vodacom. The mall has a large parking lot. It also has branches from several banks, building societies together with ATMs.

== Conference facilities ==
The mall has a conference centre, the Mlimani City Conference Centre, and a villa, the Mlimani Meadow Villas, which are all part of the Mlimani Holdings.
