= Saranga, Ubungo =

Ward of Ubungo District, Dar es Salaam Region

Saranga Kata ya Saranga (Swahili)
- Ward of Ubungo District
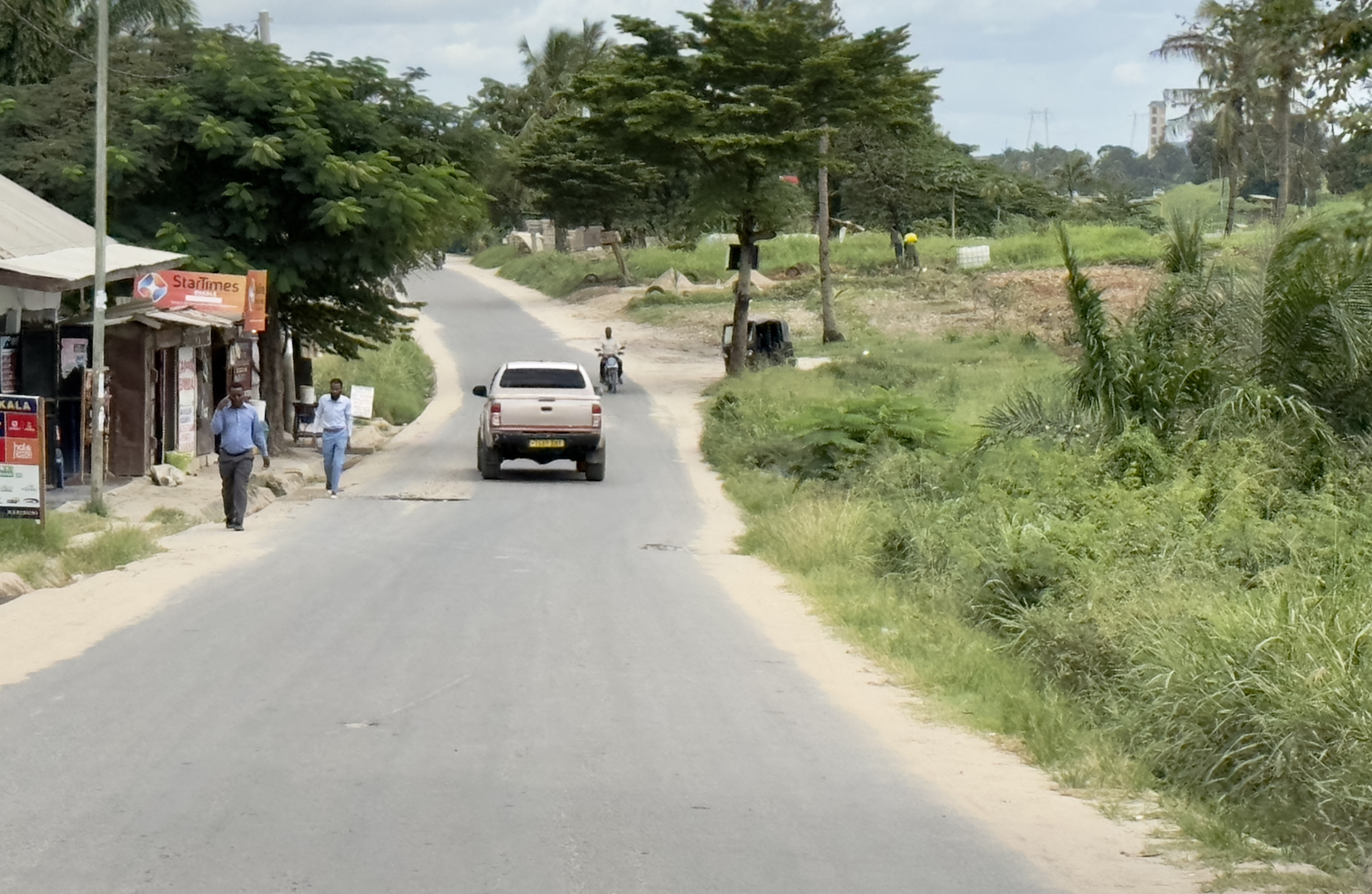
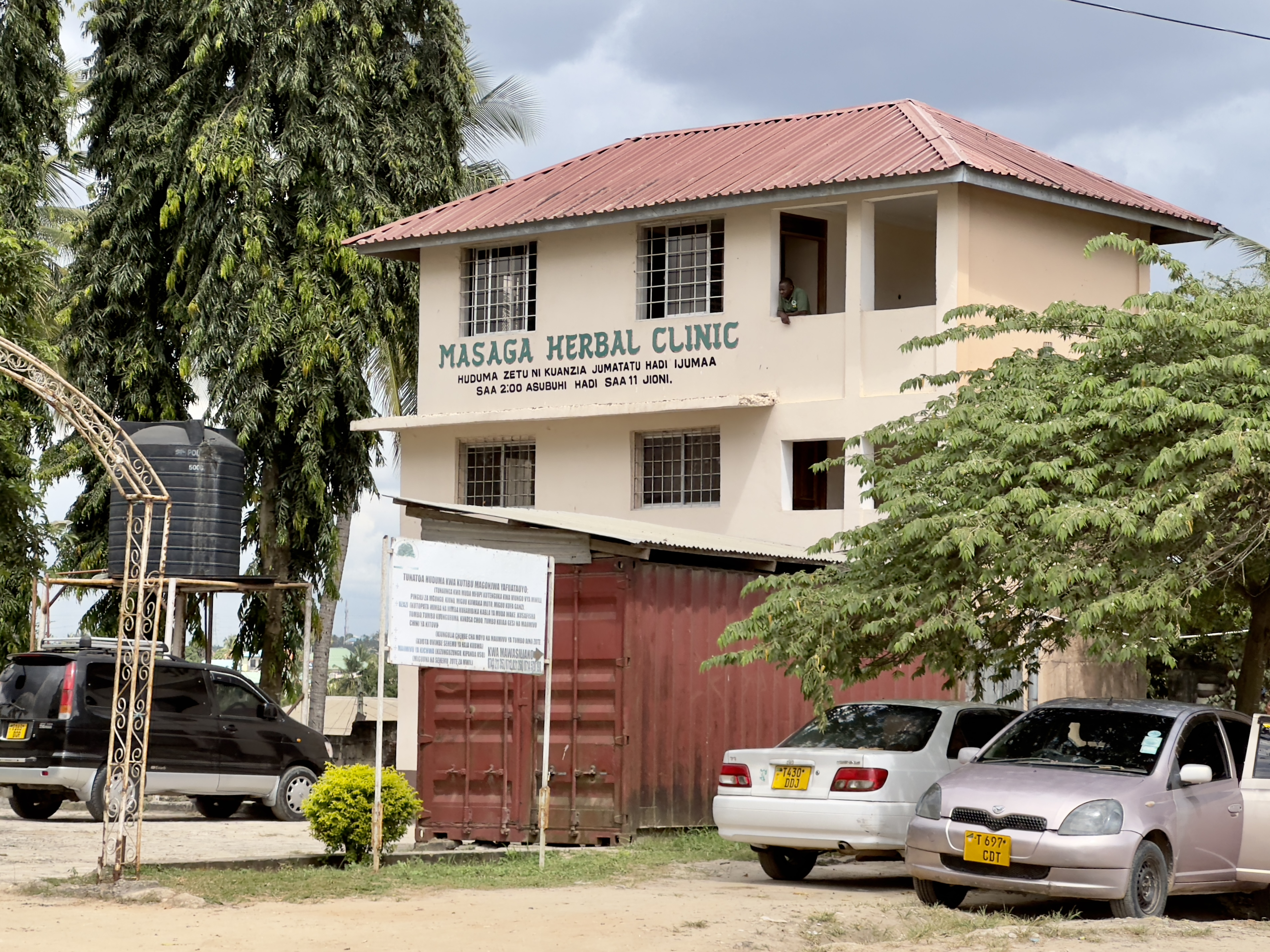
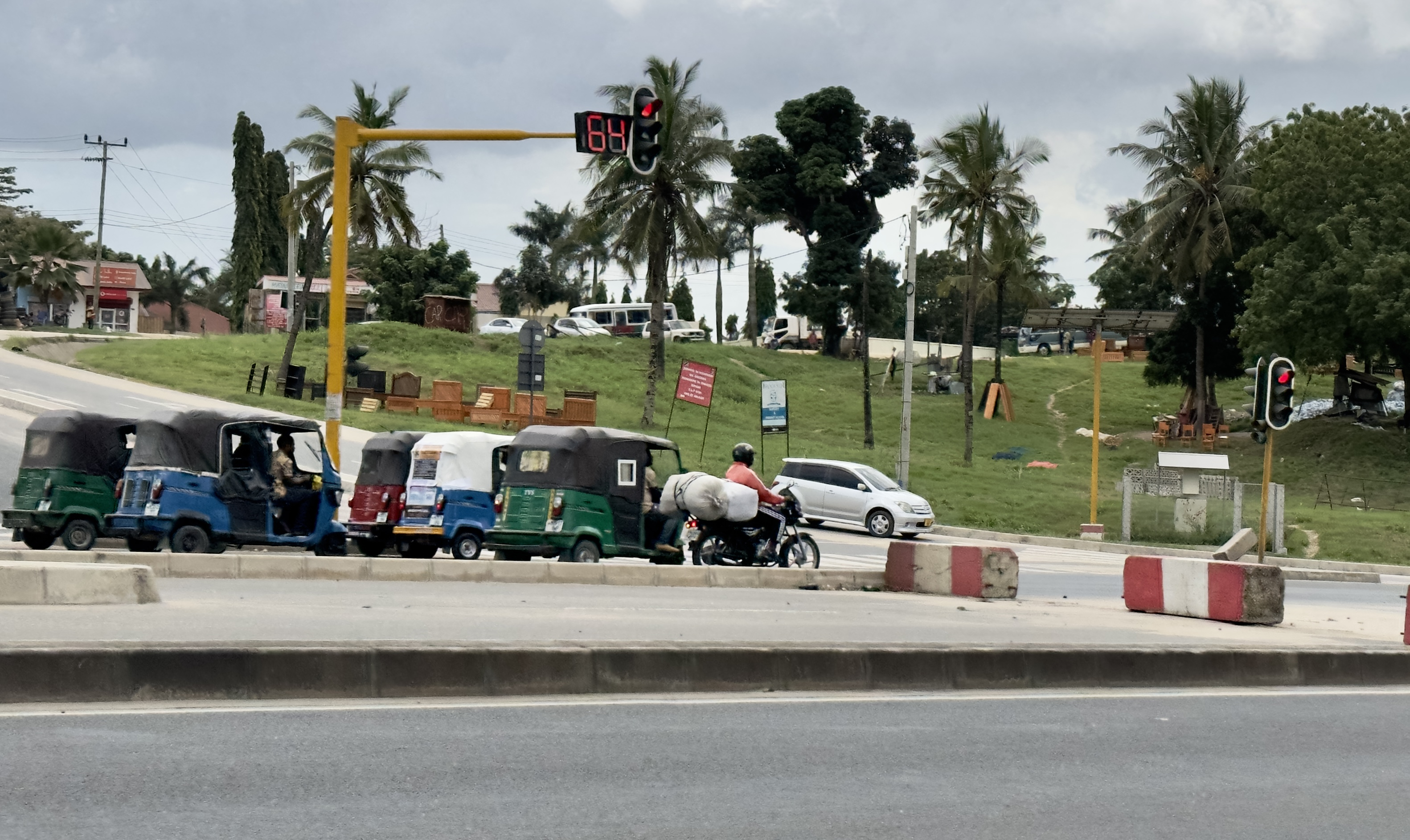
- From top to bottom
- Interactive map of Saranga
- Coordinates: 6°47′29.4″S 39°8′47.76″E
- Country: Tanzania
- Region: Dar es Salaam Region
- District: Ubungo District

Area
  - Total: 25.8 km^{2} (10.0 sq mi)

Population (2012)
  - Total: 104,127

Ethnic groups
  - Settler: Swahili
  - Ancestral: Zaramo
- Tanzanian Postal Code: 16105

Saranga (Kata ya Saranga, in Swahili) is an administrative ward in Ubungo District of the Dar es Salaam Region in Tanzania. Goba and Makongo, the latter of which is in Kinondoni MC, border the ward on the north. The ward is bordered by Kimara to the east. Ilala MC's Kinyerezi Ward is to the south. Kwembe, Msigani, and Mbezi wards are to the west. According to the 2012 census, the ward has a total population of 104,127.

== Administration ==
The postal code for Msigani Ward is 16105. The ward is divided into the following neighborhoods (Mitaa):

- Kimara "B"
- King'ongo
- Matangini
- Michugwani
- Mji Mpya, Saranga

- Saranga
- Stop Over
- Ukombozi
- Upendo, Saranga

=== Government ===
Like every other ward in the country, the ward has local government offices based on the population served. The Saranga Ward administration building houses a court as per the Ward Tribunal Act of 1988, including other vital departments for the administration of the ward. The ward has the following administration offices:

- Saranga Police Station
- Saranga Government Office (Afisa Mtendaji)
- Saranga Ward Tribunal (Baraza La Kata) is a Department inside Ward Government Office

In the local government system of Tanzania, the ward is the smallest democratic unit. Each ward comprises a committee of eight elected council members, including a chairperson, one salaried officer (with no voting rights), and an executive officer. One-third of seats are reserved for women councilors.

== Demographics ==
The ward serves as the Zaramo's ancestral home along with a sizable chunk of the district. The ward changed over time into a cosmopolitan ward as the city grew.

== Education and health ==
=== Education ===
The ward is home to these educational institutions:

- Saranga Primary School
- Anazak Primary School
- King'ongo Secondary School
- Saranga Secondary School

=== Healthcare ===
The ward is home to the following health institutions:

- Huruma Health Center
- Mhagama Health Center
- Maknesh Health Center
- Mico Kimara Health Center
- Pangasega Health Center
- Kitea Health Center
