= Kibamba =

Ward of Ubungo District, Dar es Salaam Region

Kibamba Kata ya Kibamba (Swahili)
- Ward of Ubungo District
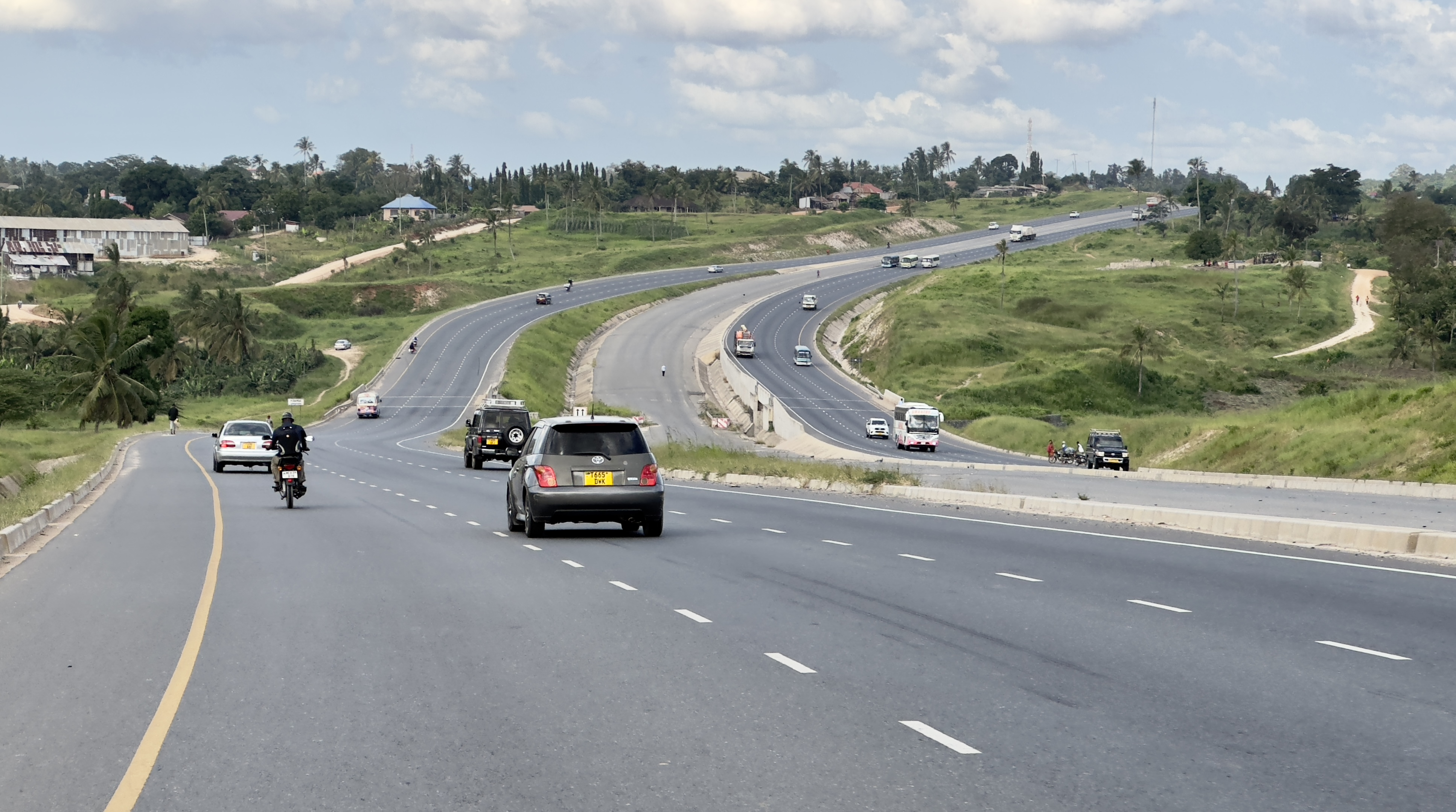
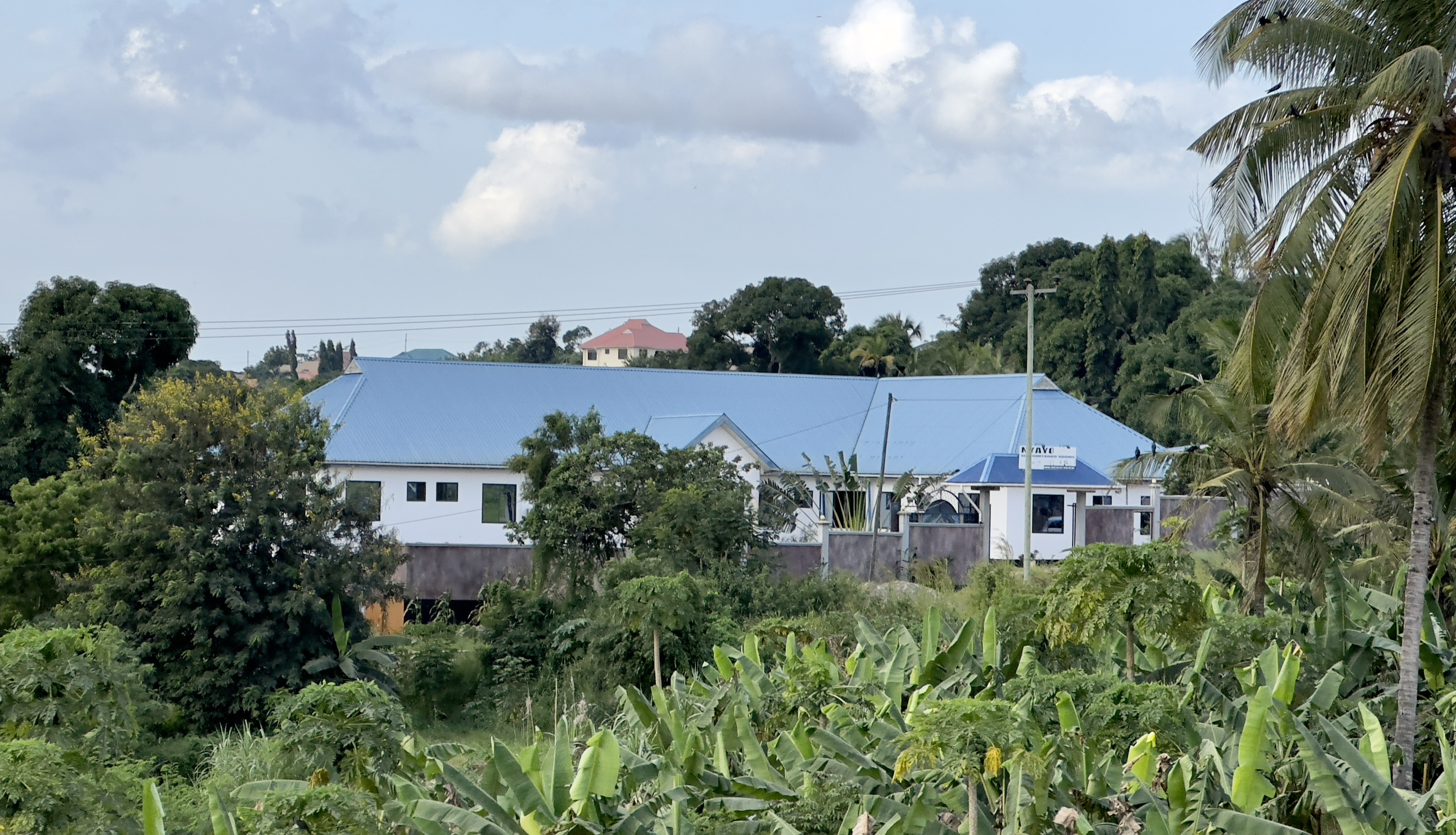
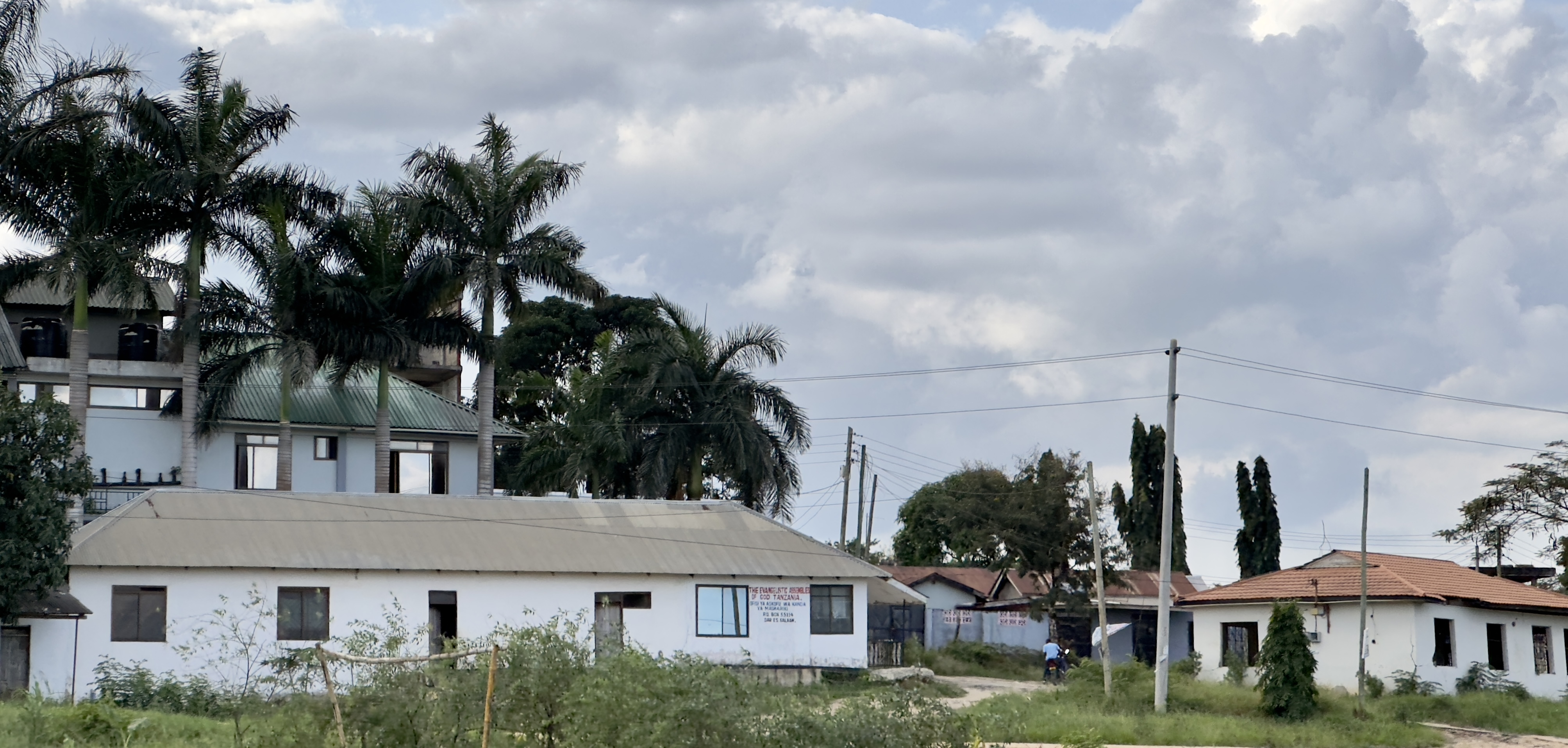
- From top to bottom: T1 National Highway through Kibamba, Building in Kibamba and Houses in Kibamba ward
- Interactive map of Kibamba
- Coordinates: 6°46′29.28″S 39°2′58.56″E
- Country: Tanzania
- Region: Dar es Salaam Region
- District: Ubungo District

Area
  - Total: 19.7 km^{2} (7.6 sq mi)

Population (2012)
  - Total: 28,885

Ethnic groups
  - Settler: Swahili
  - Ancestral: Zaramo
- Tanzanian Postal Code: 16110

Kibamba (Kata ya Kibamba in Swahili) is an administrative ward in Ubungo District of the Dar es Salaam Region in Tanzania. Mbezi and Kwembe wards border the ward to the north and east, respectively. The ward is bordered to the south by Kiluvya in the Kisarawe District and to the west by Maili Moja in the Kibaha District. According to the 2012 census, the ward has a total population of 28,885.

== Administration ==
The postal code for Kibamba Ward is 16110. The ward is divided into the following neighborhoods (Mitaa):

- Gogoni
- Hondogo
- Kibamba

- Kibwegere
- Kiluvya

=== Government ===
Like every other ward in the country, the ward has local government offices based on the population served. The Kibamba Ward administration building houses a court as per the Ward Tribunal Act of 1988, including other vital departments for the administration of the ward. The ward has the following administration offices:

- Kibamba Ward Police Station
- Kibamba Ward Government Office (Afisa Mtendaji)
- Kibamba Ward Tribunal (Baraza La Kata) is a Department inside Ward Government Office

In the local government system of Tanzania, the ward is the smallest democratic unit. Each ward comprises a committee of eight elected council members, including a chairperson, one salaried officer (with no voting rights), and an executive officer. One-third of seats are reserved for women councilors.

== Demographics ==
The ward serves as the Zaramo's ancestral home along with a sizable chunk of the district. The ward changed over time into a cosmopolitan ward as the city grew.

== Education and health ==
=== Education ===
The ward is home to these educational institutions:

- Mount Calvary Primary School
- Kiluvya Secondary School, Kibamba
- Sakana Secondary School
- Kibamba Primary School
- Kifai Modern Secondary School
- Gogoni Secondary School, Kibamba
- Motherland Academy Secondary School
- Firdaus Primary School
- Heri Secondary School, Kibamba
- CG Shulua Secondary School
- Hondogo "B" Secondary School

=== Healthcare ===
The ward is home to the following health institutions:

- Kibwegere Health Center
- Mikuru Health Center
- Dr. Ole Lengine's Memorial Hospital
- Mmasi Medical Clinic
- Mmasi Dispensary
