= Kimara =

Ward of Ubungo District, Dar es Salaam Region

Kimara Kata ya Kimara (Swahili)
- Ward of Ubungo District
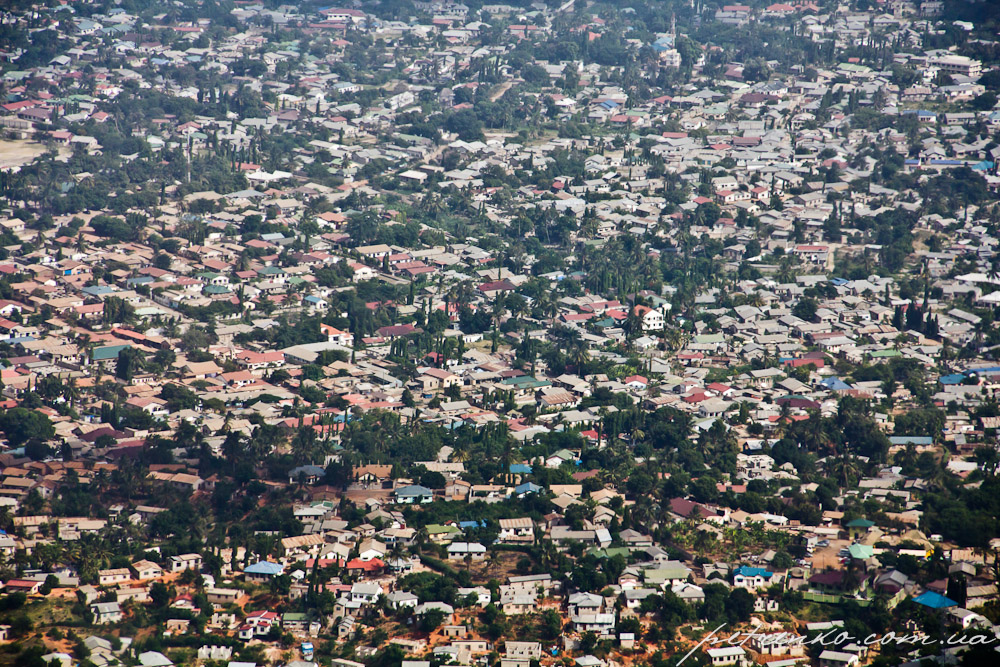
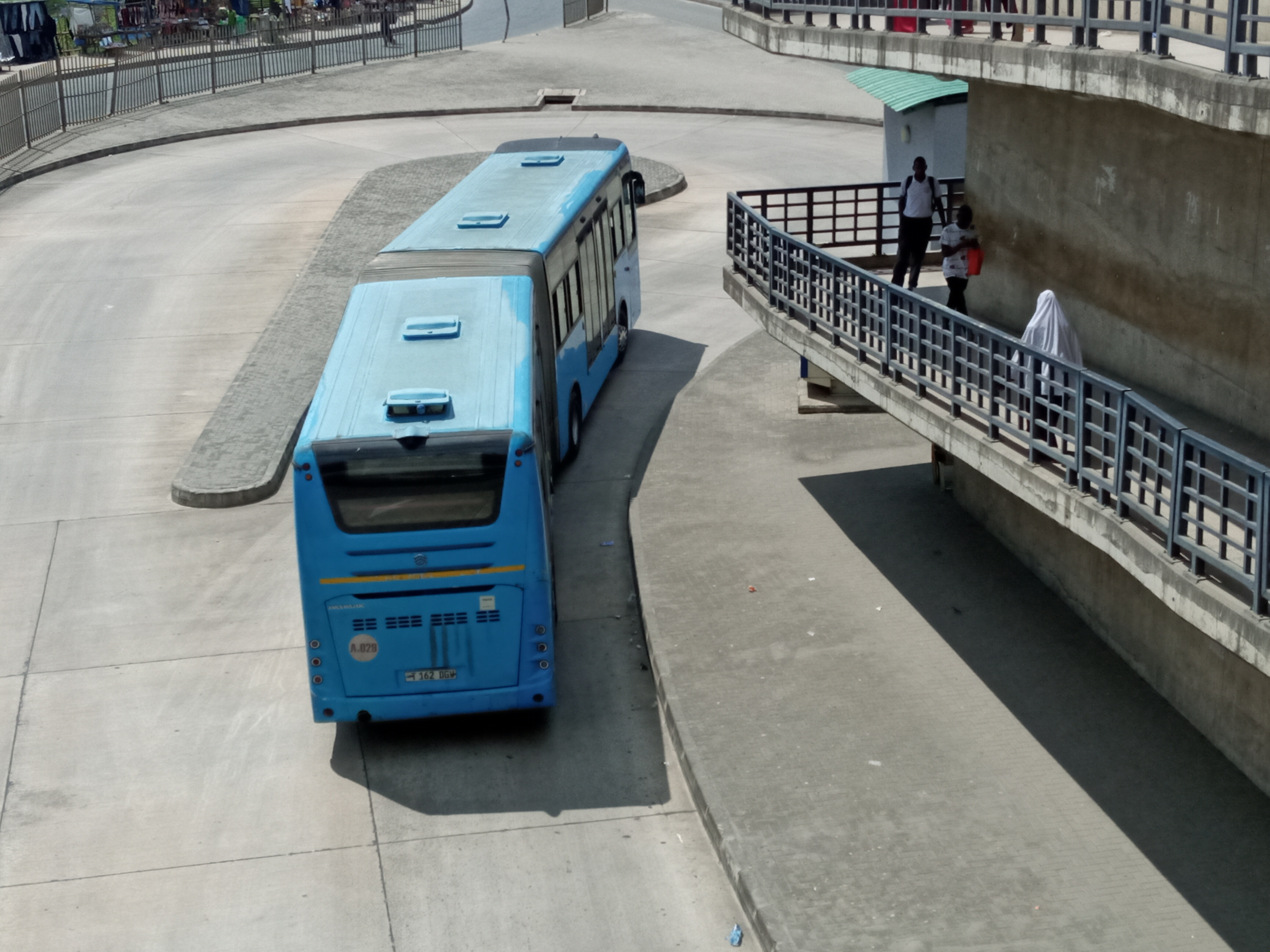
- From top to bottom: Bird's eye view of Kimara & UDART buses at Kimara Terminus
- Interactive map of Kimara
- Coordinates: 6°48′13.68″S 39°9′58.68″E
- Country: Tanzania
- Region: Dar es Salaam Region
- District: Ubungo District

Area
  - Total: 13.7 km^{2} (5.3 sq mi)

Population (2012)
  - Total: 76,577

Ethnic groups
  - Settler: Swahili
  - Ancestral: Zaramo
- Tanzanian Postal Code: 16104

Mabibo chuo (Kata ya Kimara, in Swahili) is an administrative ward in Ubungo District of the Dar es Salaam Region in Tanzania. The ward borders Kinondoni's Makongo to the north. Ubungo and Makuburi border the ward to the east. Kimanga and Kinyerezi of Ilala are to the south. Saranga ward is to the west. According to the 2012 census, the ward has a total population of 76,577.

== Administration ==
The postal code for Kimara Ward is 16104. The ward is divided into the following neighborhoods (Mitaa):

- Baruti
- Golani
- Kilungule "A"

- Kilungule "B"
- Kimara Baruti
- Mavurunza

=== Government ===
Like every other ward in the country, the ward has local government offices based on the population served. The Kimara Ward administration building houses a court as per the Ward Tribunal Act of 1988, including other vital departments for the administration of the ward. The ward has the following administration offices:

- Kimara Ward Police Station
- Kimara Ward Government Office (Afisa Mtendaji)
- Kimara Ward Tribunal (Baraza La Kata) is a Department inside Ward Government Office

In the local government system of Tanzania, the ward is the smallest democratic unit. Each ward comprises a committee of eight elected council members, including a chairperson, one salaried officer (with no voting rights), and an executive officer. One-third of seats are reserved for women councilors.

== Demographics ==
The ward serves as the Zaramo's ancestral home along with a sizable chunk of the district. The ward changed over time into a cosmopolitan ward as the city grew.

== Education and health ==
=== Education ===
The ward is home to these educational institutions:

- Libery Primary School
- Kimara Secondary School
- Sakana Secondary School
- St. Magreth Primary School
- Veritas Primary School
- Kimara Baruti Primary School
- Crested Crane International Schools, Kimara
- KAM College of Health Sciences, Kimara
- Peaceland Secondary School

=== Healthcare ===
The ward is home to the following health institutions:

- MICO Kimara Health Center
- Mavurunza Health Center
- Muzdalfa Health Center
- Paradigms Health Center
- MCDIT Health Center
- Arafa Mwananchi Health Center, Kimara
- Salama 1 Health Center
