= Sinza =

Ward of Ubungo District, Dar es Salaam Region

Sinza Kata ya Sinza (Swahili)
- Ward of Ubungo District
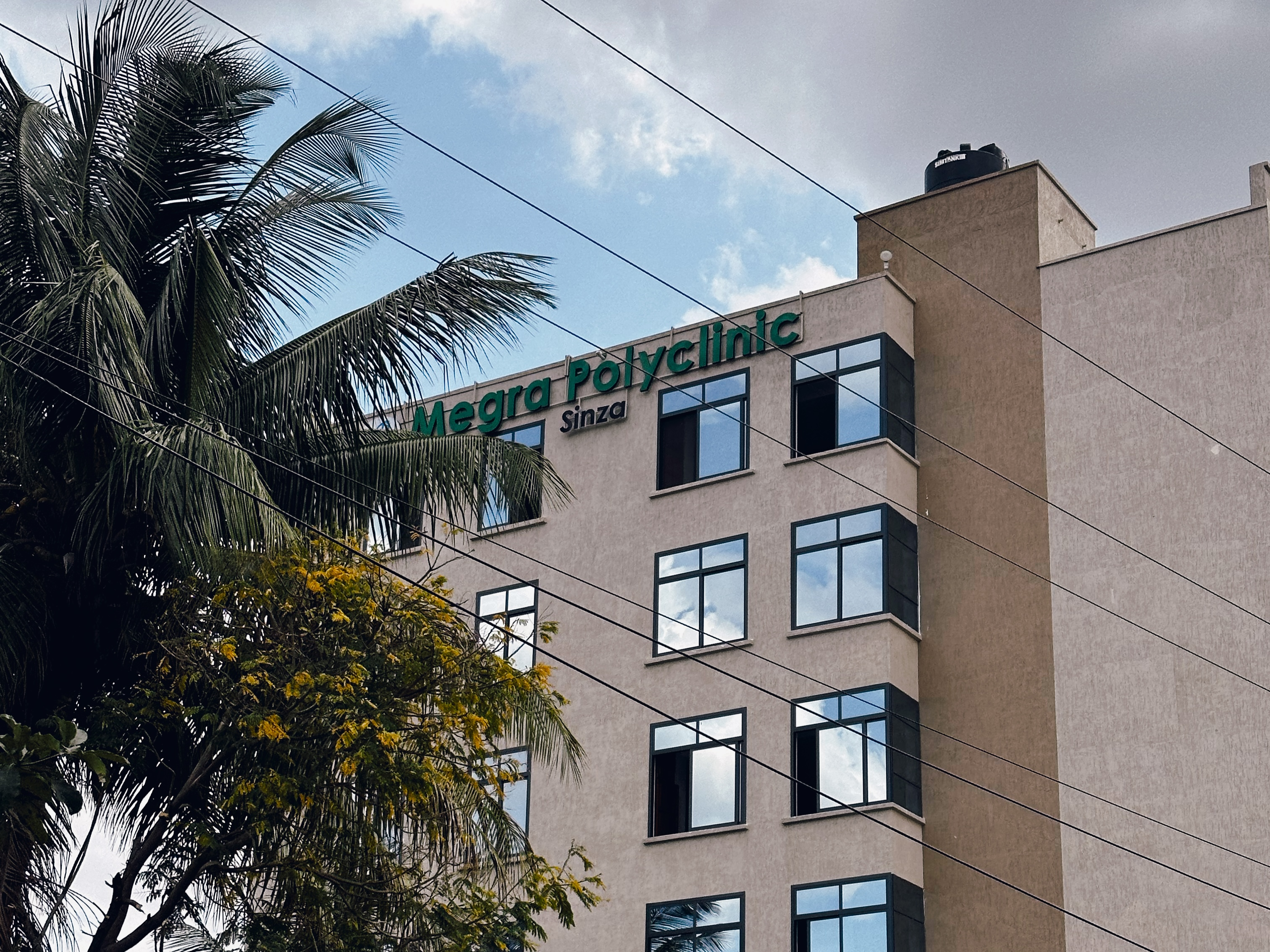
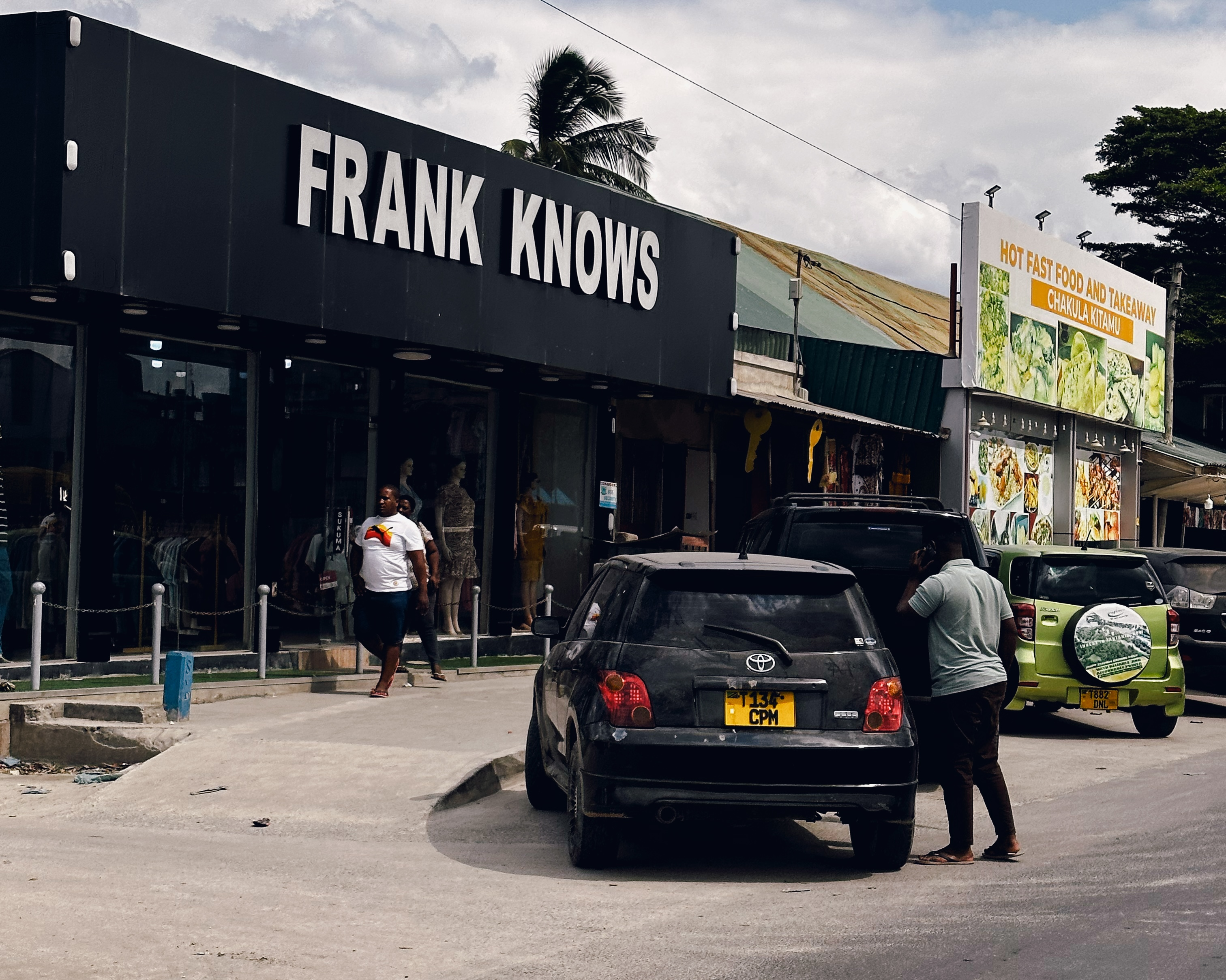
- From top to bottom: Health center in Sinza, PSSF building detail in Sinza, Storefront in Sinza
- Interactive map of Sinza
- Coordinates: 6°46′58.44″S 39°13′28.56″E
- Country: Tanzania
- Region: Dar es Salaam Region
- District: Ubungo District

Area
  - Total: 3.3 km^{2} (1.3 sq mi)

Population (2012)
  - Total: 40,546

Ethnic groups
  - Settler: Swahili
  - Ancestral: Zaramo
- Tanzanian Postal Code: 16102

Sinza (Kata ya Sinza, in Swahili) is an administrative ward in Ubungo District of the Dar es Salaam Region in Tanzania. The Kinondoni MC communities of Makongo and Kijitonyama, which border the ward to the north and east, respectively. Manzese and Ubungo wards are to the south and west of here. According to the 2012 census, the ward has a total population of 40,546.

== Administration ==
The postal code for Sinza Ward is 16102. The ward is divided into the following neighborhoods (Mitaa):

- Sinza "A"
- Sinza "B"
- Sinza "C"

- Sinza "D"
- Sinza "E"

=== Government ===
Like every other ward in the country, the ward has local government offices based on the population served. The Sinza Ward administration building houses a court as per the Ward Tribunal Act of 1988, including other vital departments for the administration of the ward. The ward has the following administration offices:

- Sinza Police Station
- Sinza Government Office (Afisa Mtendaji)
- Sinza Ward Tribunal (Baraza La Kata) is a Department inside Ward Government Office

In the local government system of Tanzania, the ward is the smallest democratic unit. Each ward comprises a committee of eight elected council members, including a chairperson, one salaried officer (with no voting rights), and an executive officer. One-third of seats are reserved for women councilors.

== Demographics ==
The ward serves as the Zaramo's ancestral home along with a sizable chunk of the district. The ward changed over time into a cosmopolitan ward as the city grew.

== Education and health ==
=== Education ===
The ward is home to these educational institutions:

- Sinza Primary School
- Sinza Maalum Primary School
- Anazak Primary School
- Mugabe Secondary School
- Mahujaa Secondary School
- Luqman Islamic Secondary School

=== Healthcare ===
The ward is home to the following health institutions:

- Sinza Health Center
- Sinza MICO Health Center
- Afya Care Health Center
