= Magufuli Bus Terminal =

Bus station in Dar es Salaam, Tanzania

Coordinates: 6.78567°S 39.10903°E

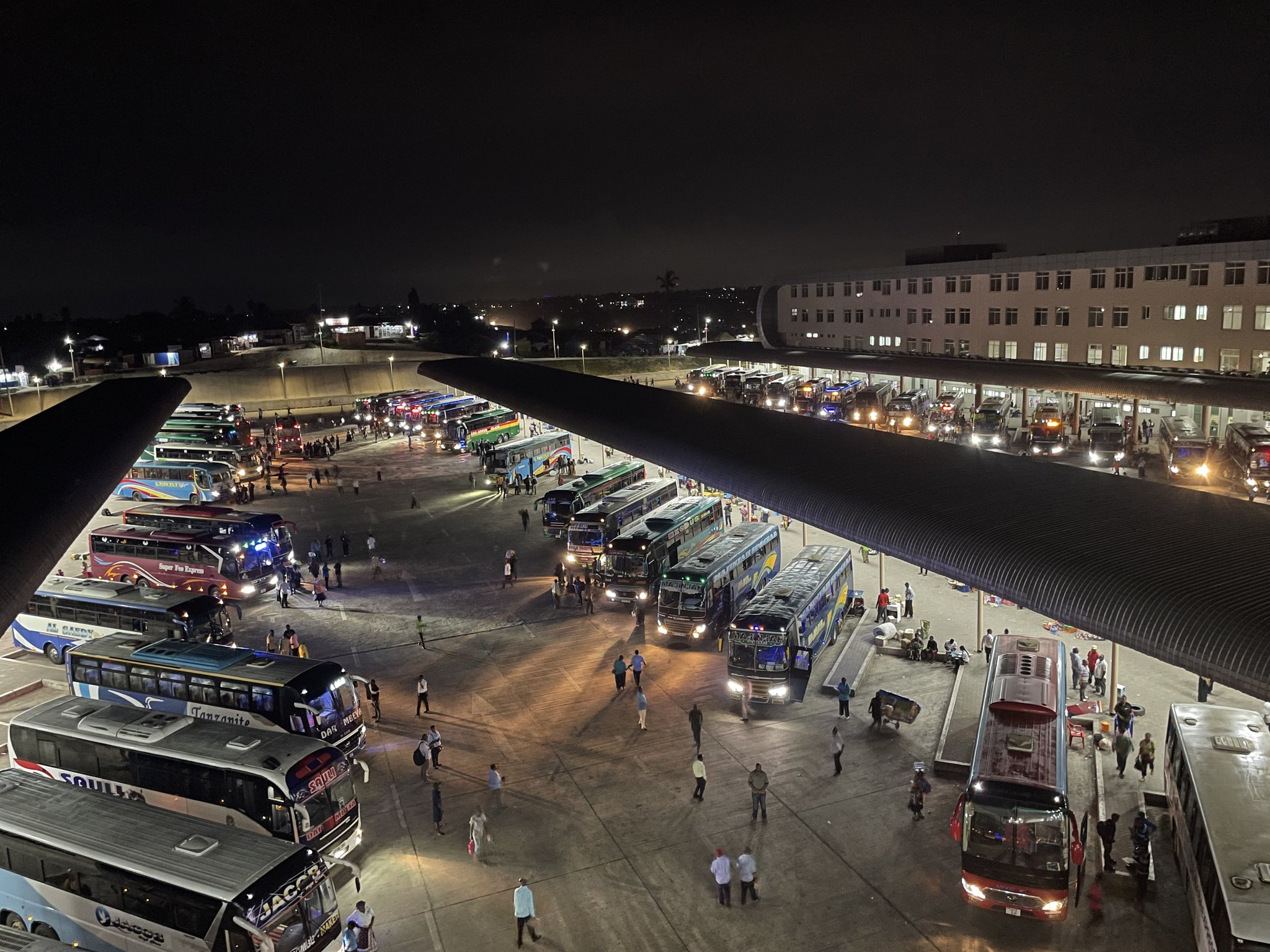
Magufuli Bus Terminal in the night

Magufuli Bus Terminal is a bus terminal located in Dar es Salaam, Tanzania.

It started operating in November 2020 and will serve over 3000 buses daily.

== Construction ==
The project was designed by Y&P Architects. In 2016, it was reported that the new ubungo bus terminal will get a facelift of 490m/ rehabiliation. In 2018, the City council of Dar es Salaam were said to be in the process of securing a good contractor who will complete the project in time. The project preparations had taken way too long because of the procedures which they had to follow, compensating the residents who were affected by the project. However the foundation stone will be laid soon to mark way for the construction work. The project has cost the government an amount of $22m which is approximately Sh50.9 billion. The residents who were affected by the project have been paid a compensation of Sh8.5 billion by the government.

The project kicked off in January 2019 by the Chinese contractor of Hignan Construction company and is set for completion by the end of 2020. In June 2020, the project had reached 70 percent and few months later on November 25th, the bus had started its operational trial.

== Terminals ==
=== Phase I ===
It includes a big bus station which is filled with buses. All the Upcountry buses using the Ubungo bus terminal have relocated here to the new terminal.

NMB Bank have booked a space at the new terminals well.

=== Phase II ===
Construction of Phase II is set to begin in 2021. This area will include hotels and shopping malls.

== Other facilities ==
- National Microfinance Bank
