= Ubungo, Ubungo District =

Ward of Ubungo District, Dar es Salaam Region

Ubungo Kata ya Ubungo (Swahili)
- Ward of Ubungo District
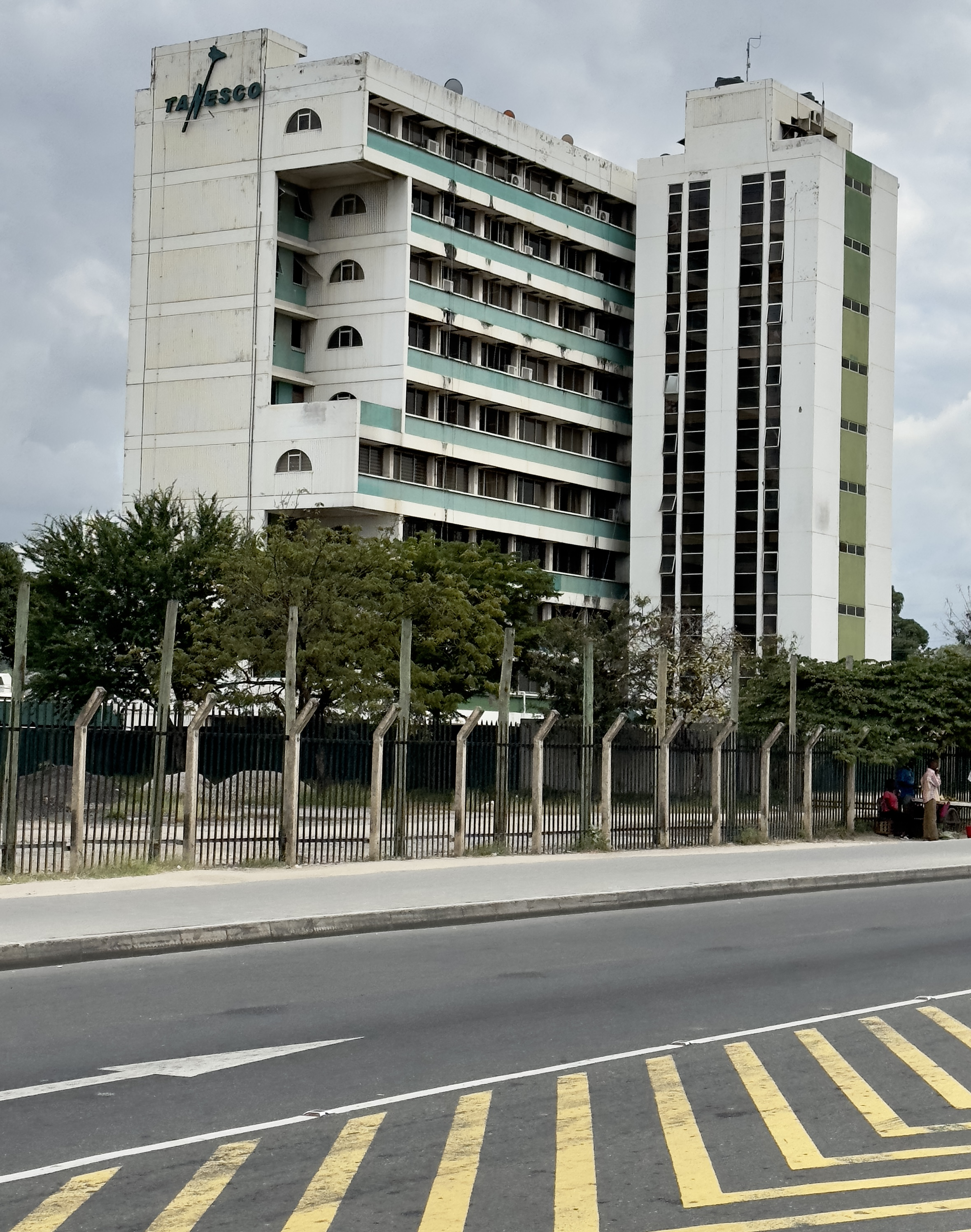
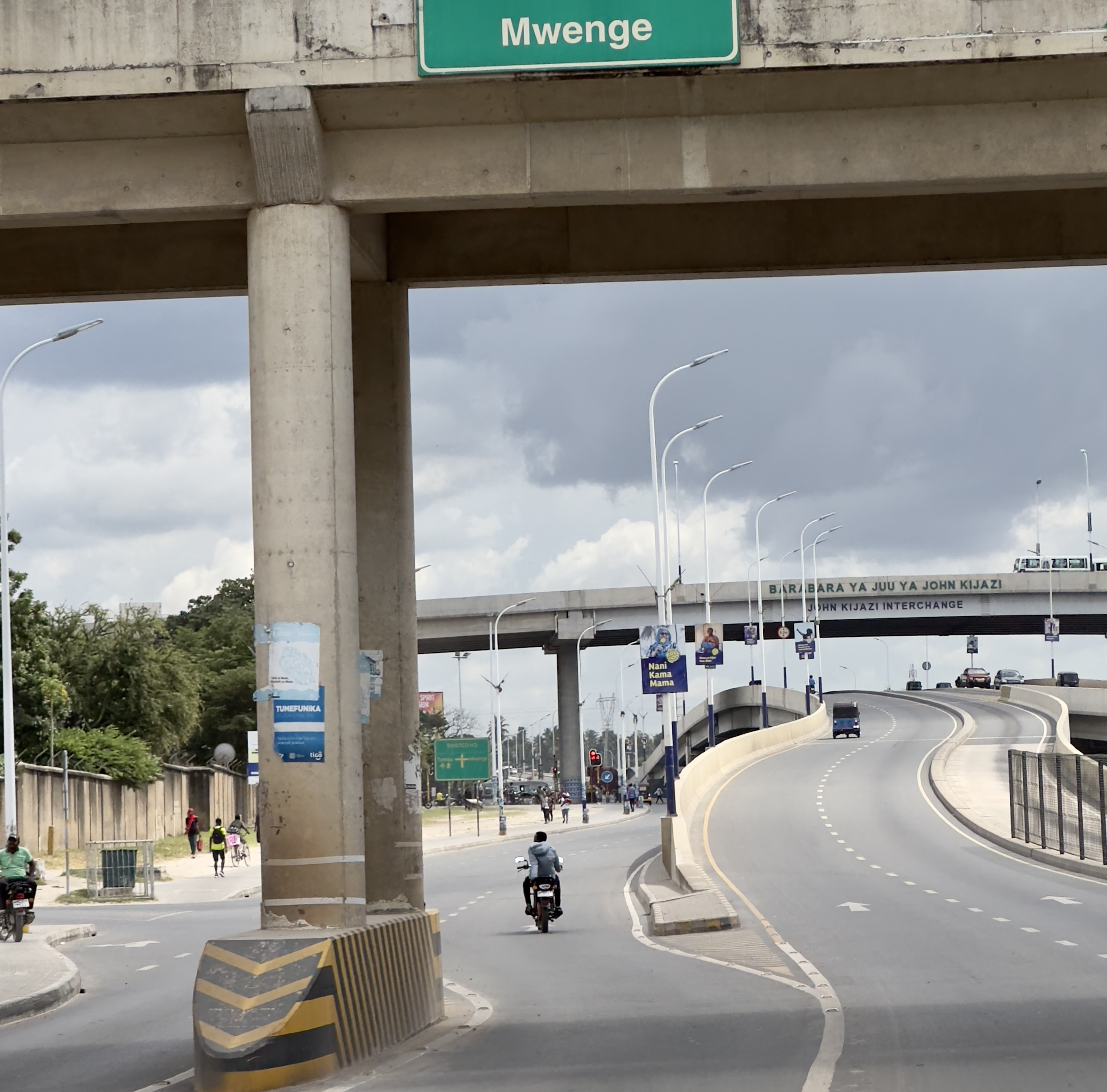
- From top to bottom: Ubungo Plaza in Ubungo ward, Umemep Park in Ubungo ward, Kijazi Interchange
- Nickname: The University ward
- Interactive map of Ubungo
- Coordinates: 6°47′33″S 39°12′31.32″E
- Country: Tanzania
- Region: Dar es Salaam Region
- District: Ubungo District

Area
  - Total: 3.3 km^{2} (1.3 sq mi)

Population (2012)
  - Total: 56,015

Ethnic groups
  - Settler: Swahili
  - Ancestral: Zaramo
- Tanzanian Postal Code: 16103

Ubungo (Kata ya Ubungo, in Swahili) is an administrative ward in Ubungo District of the Dar es Salaam Region in Tanzania. Makongo and Sinza form the northern and eastern boundaries of the ward. Wards of Mabibo, Makuburi, and Kimara are to the south and west. The ward is home to the University of Dar es Salaam and Ubungo Thermal Power Station. According to the 2012 census, the ward has a total population of 56,015.

== Administration ==
The postal code for Ubungo Ward is 16103. The ward is divided into the following neighborhoods (Mitaa):

- Chuo Kikuu
- Kibo, Ubungo
- Kisiwani, Ubungo

- Msewe
- National Housing, Ubungo

=== Government ===
Like every other ward in the country, the ward has local government offices based on the population served. The Ubungo Ward administration building houses a court as per the Ward Tribunal Act of 1988, including other vital departments for the administration of the ward. The ward has the following administration offices:

- Ubungo Police Station
- Ubungo Government Office (Afisa Mtendaji)
- Ubungo Ward Tribunal (Baraza La Kata) is a Department inside Ward Government Office

In the local government system of Tanzania, the ward is the smallest democratic unit. Each ward comprises a committee of eight elected council members, including a chairperson, one salaried officer (with no voting rights), and an executive officer. One-third of seats are reserved for women councilors.

== Demographics ==
The ward serves as the Zaramo's ancestral home along with a sizable chunk of the district. The ward changed over time into a cosmopolitan ward as the city grew.

== Education and health ==
=== Education ===
The ward is home to these educational institutions:

- Ubungo Plaza Primary School
- Kibangu Primary School
- Atlas Primary School
- Ubungo Kisiwani Primary School
- Mpakani Primary School, Ubungo
- Umoja Primary School, Ubungo
- Ubungo Modern Secondary School
- Mahujaa Secondary School
- Ubungo Islamic Secondary School

=== Healthcare ===
The ward is home to the following health institutions:

- Arafa NHC Health Center
- Chuo Kikuu Health Center
- Msewe Health Center
- Oasis Health Center
