= Ubungo District =

District of Dar es Salaam Region

Ubungo District Halimashauri ya Manispaa ya Ubungo (Swahili)
- District of Dar es Salaam
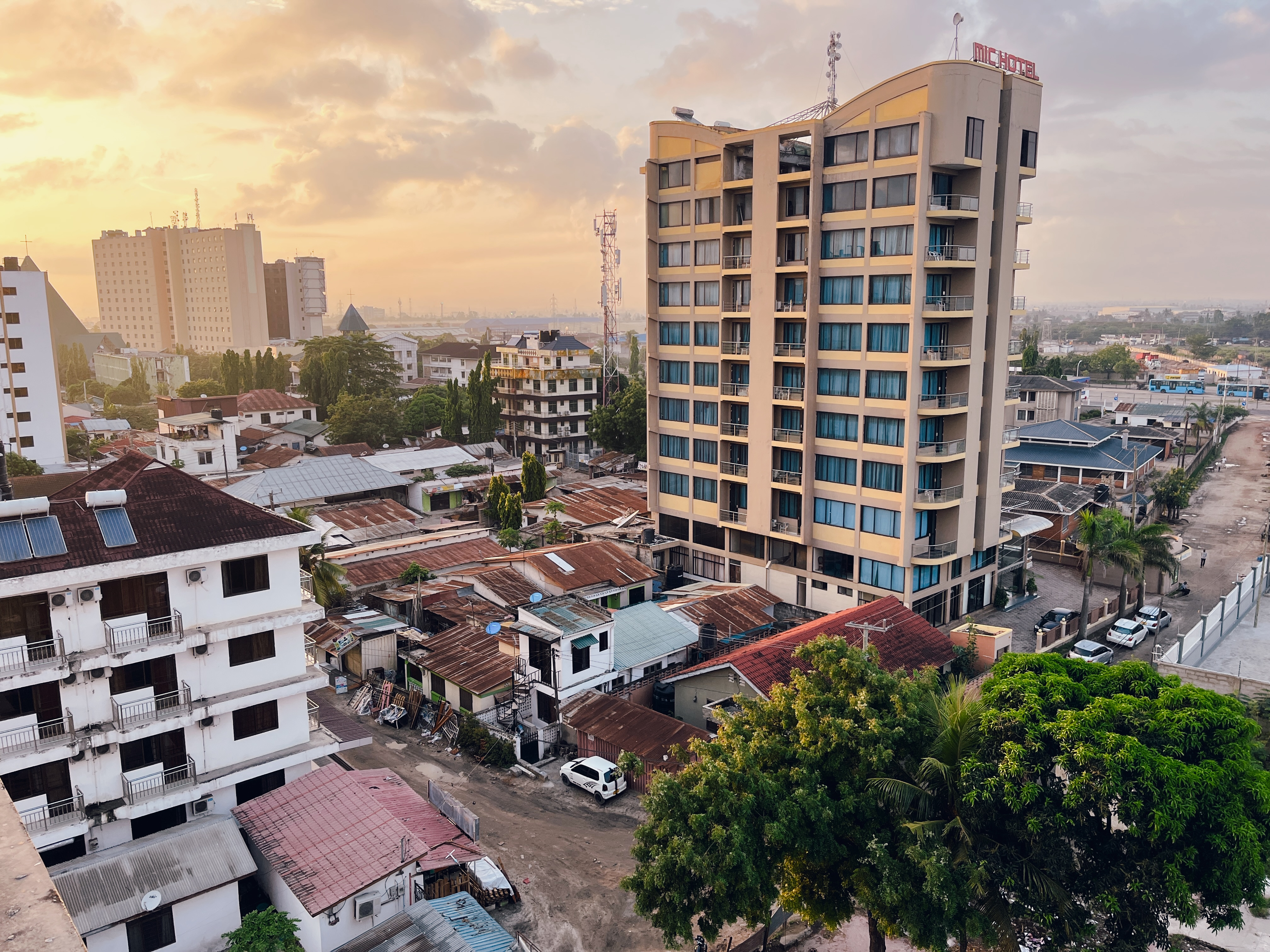
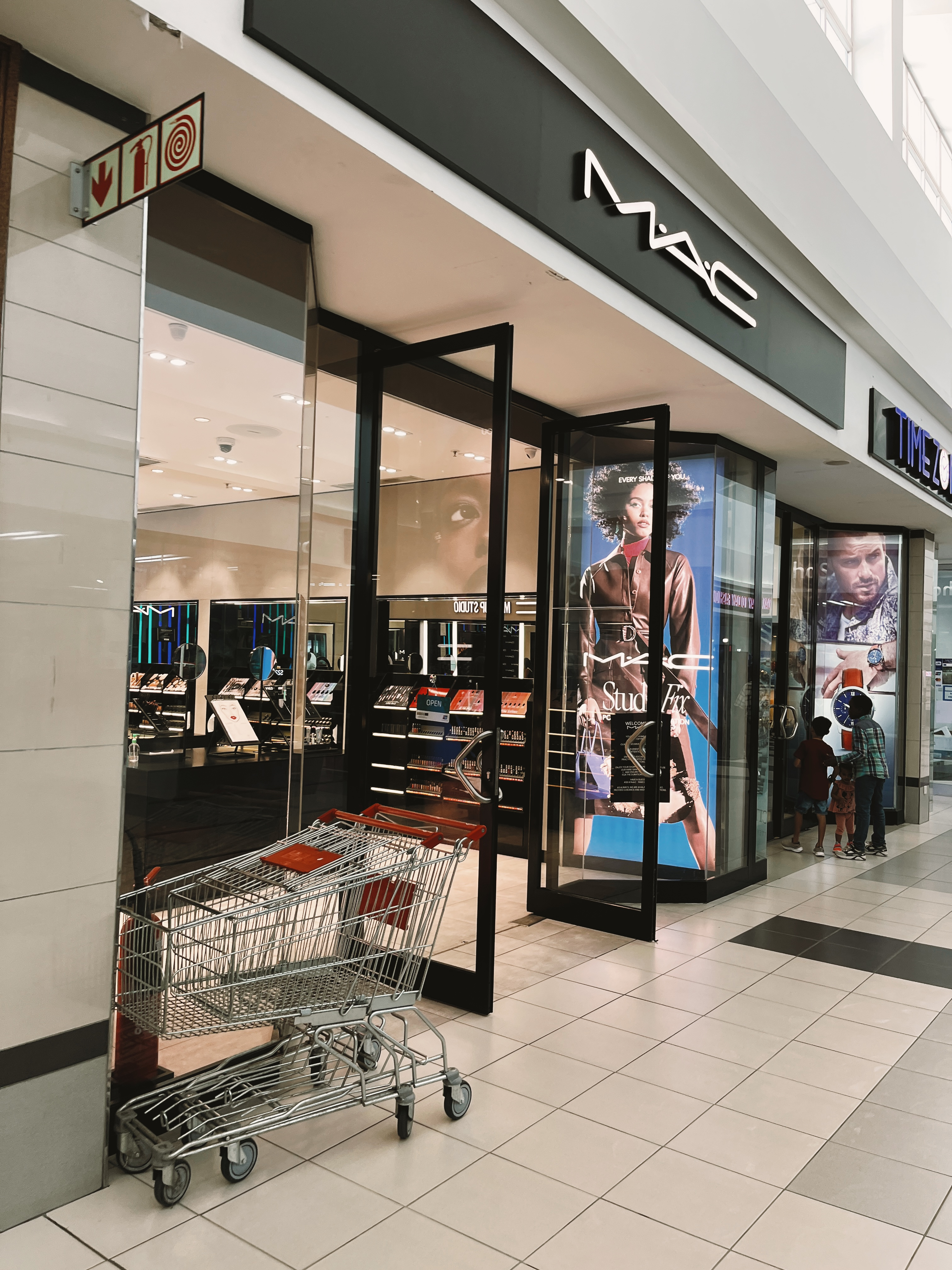
- From top to bottom: scene in Ubungo ward, PSSSF Complex towers in Sinza & MAC store inside Mlimani city Mall in Ubungo ward
- Nickname: The Crossroads district
- Ubungo District in Dar
- Coordinates: 6°47′20″S 39°12′20″E
- Country: Tanzania
- Region: Dar es Salaam Region
- Named for: Ubungo village
- Capital: Kwembe

Area
  - Total: 269.4 km^{2} (104.0 sq mi)
  - Rank: 4th in Dar
- Highest elevation (Kwembe): 225 m (738 ft)

Population (2022 census)
  - Total: 1,086,912
  - Rank: 3rd in Dar
  - Density: 4,035/km^{2} (10,450/sq mi)
- Demonym: Ubungoan

Ethnic groups
  - Settler: Swahili
  - Native: Zaramo
- Time zone: UTC+3 (EAT)
- Tanzanian Postcode: 161
- Website: Official website
- Symbols of Tanzania
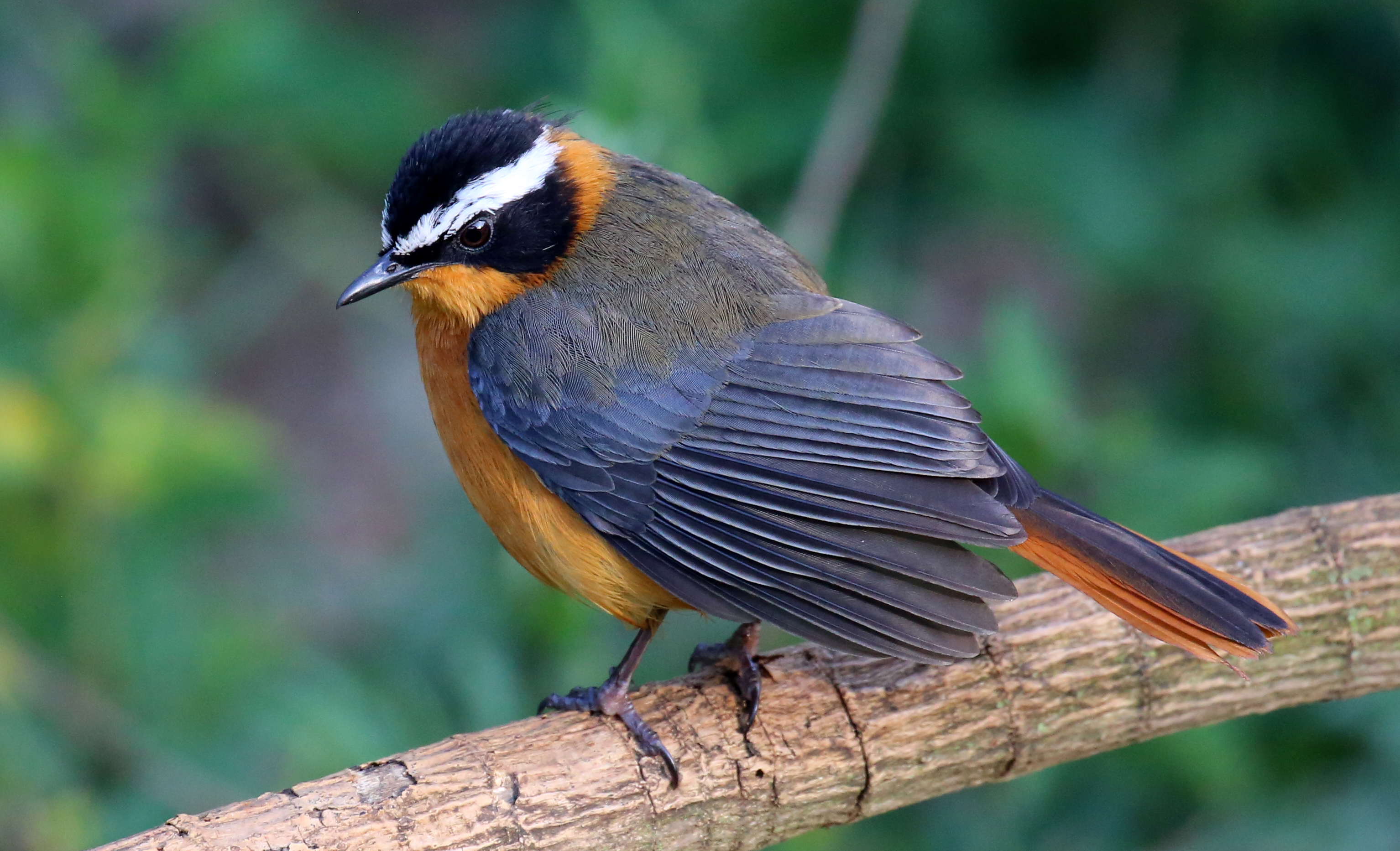
- Bird: white-browed robin chat
- Fish: Red-spot barb
- Mammal: Tanzanian woolly bat

Ubungo District, officially the, Ubungo Municipal Council (Halimashauri ya Manispaa ya Ubungo, in Swahili) is one of five districts of the Dar es Salaam Region of Tanzania. The Kinondoni District and Kibaha of the Pwani Region border the district to the north; the Kisarawe District of Pwani Region borders it to the west; and the Ilala District borders the it to the south and east. The district covers an area of 269.4 km^{2} (104.0 sq mi). The district is comparable in size to the land area of St. Kitts and Nevis. The administrative seat is Kwembe. The district is home to the University of Dar es Salaam, The Magufuli Bus Terminal, the largest in the country, and Pande Game Reserve the largest protected land area in Dar es Salaam Region. In addition, the district is home to the largest natural gas powered power station, the Ubungo Thermal Power Station and the headquarters of the Tanzania Electric Supply Company Limited (TANESCO). The 2022 census states the population of the district as 1,086,912.

== History ==
The Zaramo, a Bantu-speaking tribe, have lived in the area that is now Ubungo for thousands of years. Similar to the Zaramo, the Kaguru from Morogoro Region, are a matrilineal community and cousins. The Kaguru word Lubungo, which refers to a strong, malleable form of wood and is frequently used to describe a tough, resilient woman—the ideal sort of woman, may be the source of the Ubungo's derivation. Most likely the district got its name from the Lubungo River, which a tributary of the Msimbazi River.

== Wards ==
The fourteen (14) wards that make up the Ubungo Municipal Council are further subdivided into sub-wards known as Mtaa (single) or Mitaa (plural). It takes 91 Mitaa. Additionally, the Municipality includes two electoral districts: Ubungo and Kibamba. The Full Council, which is the entity in charge of municipal affairs, is made up of 14 Councillors, two of whom are elected MPs from specific constituencies. The wards are listed below:

1. Goba
2. Kibamba
3. Kimara
4. Kwembe
5. Mabibo
6. Makuburi
7. Makurumla
8. Manzese
9. Mbezi
10. Mburahati
11. Msigani
12. Saranga
13. Sinza
14. Ubungo

== Economy ==
=== Infrastructure ===
==== Transport ====
A total of 386.3 km of roads in the Ubungo District Council are maintained by the council, with 23 km of asphalt, 245.25 km of gravel, 118.05 km of earth roads, and 78 bridges and box culverts. Ubungo Interchange was launched in February 2021, and was named to honor the late Chief Secretary, John Kijazi. The bus terminal that was formerly called Ubungo Bus Terminal has been relocated to Magufuli Bus Terminal in Mbezi. The old Ubungo Bus Terminal has been converted to a new UDART bus service station as of November 2021.

=== Water and Sanitation ===
Residents of Ubungo get their water primarily from the Lower and Upper Ruvu, which are run by the Dar es Salaam Water and Sewerage Authority (DAWASA). 68% of the water used each day comes from DAWASA systems, with the remaining portion coming from shallow and deep wells that are both privately and communally held. Only 68% of the estimated 1,031349 residents in Kinondoni Municipality have direct access to clean and safe water, and the remaining 32% do not have easy access.

=== Labor force ===
Ubungo is thought to have a population of 1,031,349 in 2016, of whom 701,317 are of working age. The remaining population is made up of elderly people and children, who total 20,626 and 309,404, respectively. where 61% of the workforce works in the private sector, 35% is self-employed, and 4% is working in government. Private businesses, institutions, businesses, petty traders, fishing, livestock rearing, and agricultural pursuits are among the activities involved.

=== Trade and services ===
Small-scale industry is primarily centered in residential areas and is concentrated in home production sectors dispersed throughout the Municipal. Tanzanians working individually or in groups produce a wide variety of commodities in this industry. The authorized industrial regions of Ubungo, Mabibo, and Makuburi are home to large-scale businesses. Ubungo hosts the country's second-largest indoor shopping mall, the Mlimani City Shopping Mall.

The National Bank of Commerce (NBC), National Micro Finance Bank (NMB), Tanzania Postal Bank, Akiba Commercial Bank, Access Bank, Azania Bank, and Efatha Bank Ltd. are the main financial institutions with services in the Municipality. Some loan facilities established by the Kinondoni Municipal Council are geared toward women and young people. These include the Kinondoni Youth Employment Network for Urban Renewal (K-YEN-UR), the Women Development Funds (WDF), and the Village Community Bank (VICOBA) through the Kinondoni Women and Youth Development Funds (KWYDF).

== Population ==
The Zaramo and Ndengereko minorities were the district's original residents, but subsequent urbanization has made Ubungo one of Tanzania's most ethnically diverse districts, some wards have ethnic majorities for example Kimara ward is home to one of the largest Chagga communities outside Kilimanjaro Region.

The municipality had a population of 1,086,912 in 2022, with 519,925 males and 566,987 females. According to the census, there are 317,087 households in the city, with an average of 3.4 people per home.

== Health and Education ==
=== Education ===
There are 113 pre-primary schools in the Ubungo Municipal Council, of which 60 are owned by the government and 53 by the private sector. Additionally, the District Council has 118 primary schools, of which 64 are owned by the government and 54 by the private sector. 76,346 students in STD I through STD VII are enrolled in all 64 primary schools, together with 2,434 teachers.

There are 113 pre-primary schools in the Ubungo Municipal Council, of which 60 are owned by the government and 53 by the private sector. Additionally, the District Council has 118 primary schools, of which 64 are owned by the government and 54 by the private sector. 76,346 students in STD I through STD VII are enrolled in all 64 primary schools, together with 2,434 teachers.

For higher learning institutions, Ubungu is home to The University of Dar es Salaam, and St.Joseph University in Kwembe.

=== Health ===
In cooperation with service providers from the commercial sector, the Ubungo District Council is in charge of delivering health services to its residents. The council currently has 68 health facilities in total, 17 of which are held by the government and the remaining 51 by private organizations. The sole government-owned hospital in the Municipality that offers medical services is Sinza Hospital. This hospital, which provides services for 1,000 to 1,500 in-and-out patients daily, is known as a district hospital.

== Sports and culture ==
The municipality already has certain sports organizations, such as the Ubungo Football Association (UFA), but Ubungo Municipal is also working to start organizations for boxing, handball, volleyball, table tennis, and netball. The primary sports venues are Makurumla Sports Field, owned by CCM, Baraza Sports Field in Mburahati, Manzese Roman Catholic Church, where netball courts are located, Sahala Sports Ground in Mburahati, Kiluvya, Kwembe, Kibamba, Ubungo Nation Housing, and Kines Football Group. Municipality facilities also include play areas for educational and public institutions, including the University of Dar es Salaam.

Musical legends like Wazee wa Ngwasuma (i.FM Academy), Acudo Impact, Diamond Music Entertainment, Twanga Pepeta Entertainment, Bwagamoyo Sound, Mapacha Watatu, Utalii Band, Vijana Bendi, and Malaika Band are all based in Ubungo.
