= Kwembe =

Ward of Ubungo District, Dar es Salaam Region

Kwembe Kata ya Kwembe (Swahili)
- Ward of Ubungo District
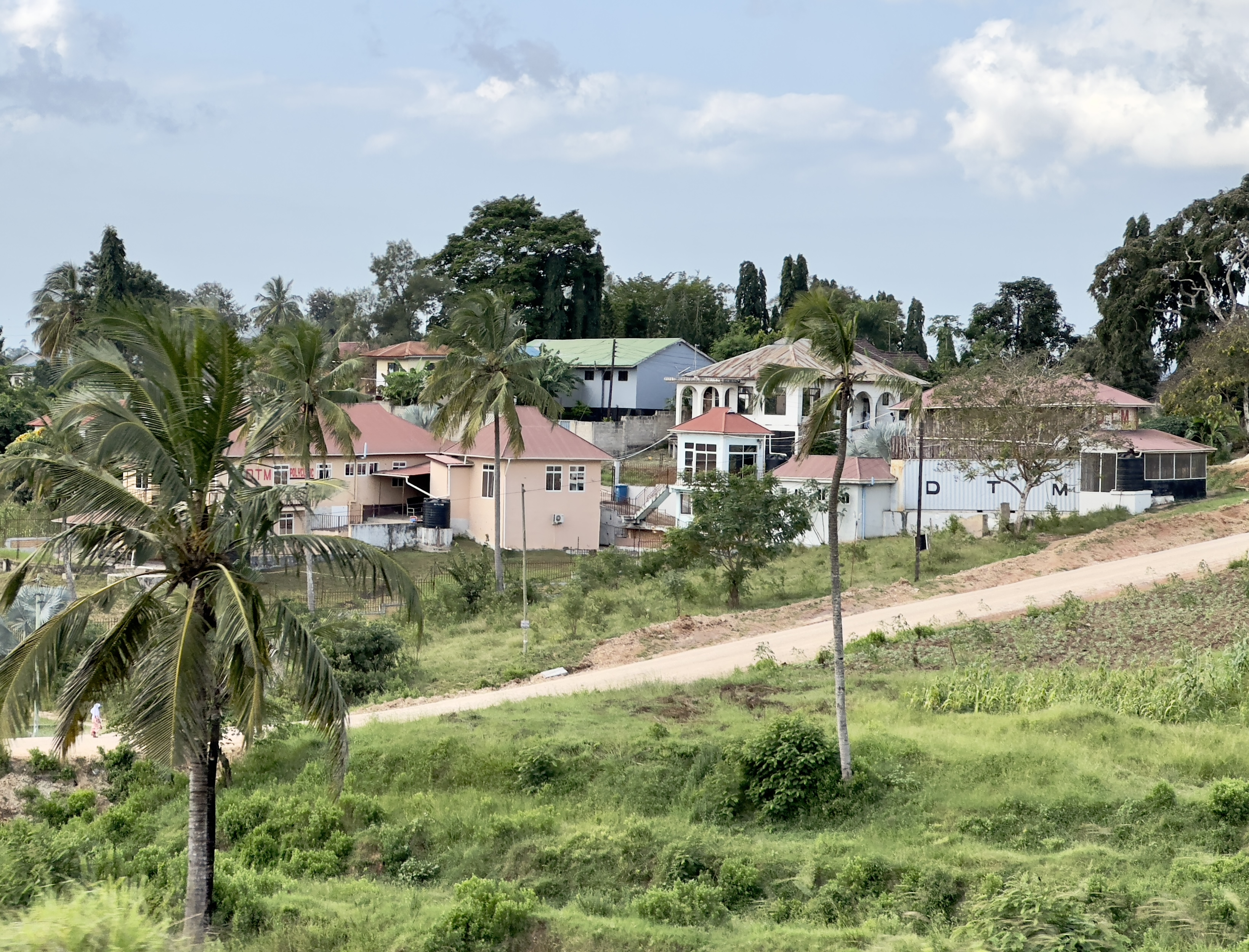
- From top to bottom: Homes in Kwembe
- Nickname: Ubungo's capital
- Location within Tanzania
- Coordinates: 6°48′27.72″S 39°4′54.48″E
- Country: Tanzania
- Region: Dar es Salaam Region
- District: Ubungo District

Area
  - Total: 60.4 km^{2} (23.3 sq mi)

Population (2012)
  - Total: 56,899
- Demonym: Kwembean

Ethnic groups
  - Settler: Swahili
  - Ancestral: Zaramo
- Tanzanian Postal Code: 16111

Kwembe (Kata ya Kwembe in Swahili) is an administrative ward and district capital of the Ubungo District of the Dar es Salaam Region in Tanzania. The ward is bordered to the north by the wards of Mbezi and Kibamba, and to the east by the wards of Kinyerezi and Pugu in the Ilala District. To the west the ward is bordred with Kisarawe District's the Kiluvya and Kisarawe wards of Pwani Region. According to the 2012 Census the ward has a population of 56,899

== Administration ==
The postal code for Kwembe Ward is 16111. The ward is divided into the following neighborhoods (Mitaa):

- King'azi
- King'azi B
- Kisopwa
- Kwembe, Kwembe ward
- Luguruni
- Mjimpya, Kwembe
- Mlongazila
- Mpakani
- Msakuzi
- Njeteni

=== Government ===
The ward, like every other ward in the country, has local government offices based on the population served.The Kwembe Ward administration building houses a court as per the Ward Tribunal Act of 1988, including other vital departments for the administration the ward. The ward has the following administration offices:

- Kwembe Ward Police Station
- Kwembe Ward Government Office (Afisa Mtendaji, Kata ya Ndugumbi)
- Kwembe Ward Tribunal (Baraza La Kata) is a Department inside Ward Government Office

In the local government system of Tanzania, the ward is the smallest democratic unit. Each ward is composed of a committee of eight elected council members which include a chairperson, one salaried officer (with no voting rights), and an executive officer. One-third of seats are reserved for women councillors.

== Economy ==
The Kwembe ward is home to the Unbungo Municipal Office, The Office of the District Commissioner, and many other local government offices such as the NIDA Ubungo Office. The ward hosts the Muhimbili Mloganzila Hospital, The East African Center for Cardiovascular Excellence and St. Joseph's University.

== Demographics ==
Like much of the district, the ward is the ancestral home of the Zaramo people. The ward evolved into a cosmopolitan ward as the city progressed over time.

== Education and health ==
=== Education ===
The ward is home to these educational institutions:

- King'azi Primary School
- Joyvilla Primary School
- Golden Light Primary School
- Luguruni Secondary School
- barbo Johansson Secondary School

=== Healthcare ===
The ward is home to the following health institutions:

- Amani Health Center, Kwembe
- Muhimbili Hospital, Mlongazila
- Saint Benedict's Hospital
- Kisopwa Health Center
- Mdidimua Hopital
