= Mburahati =

Ward of Ubungo District, Dar es Salaam Region

Mburahati Kata ya Mburahati (Swahili)
- Ward of Ubungo District
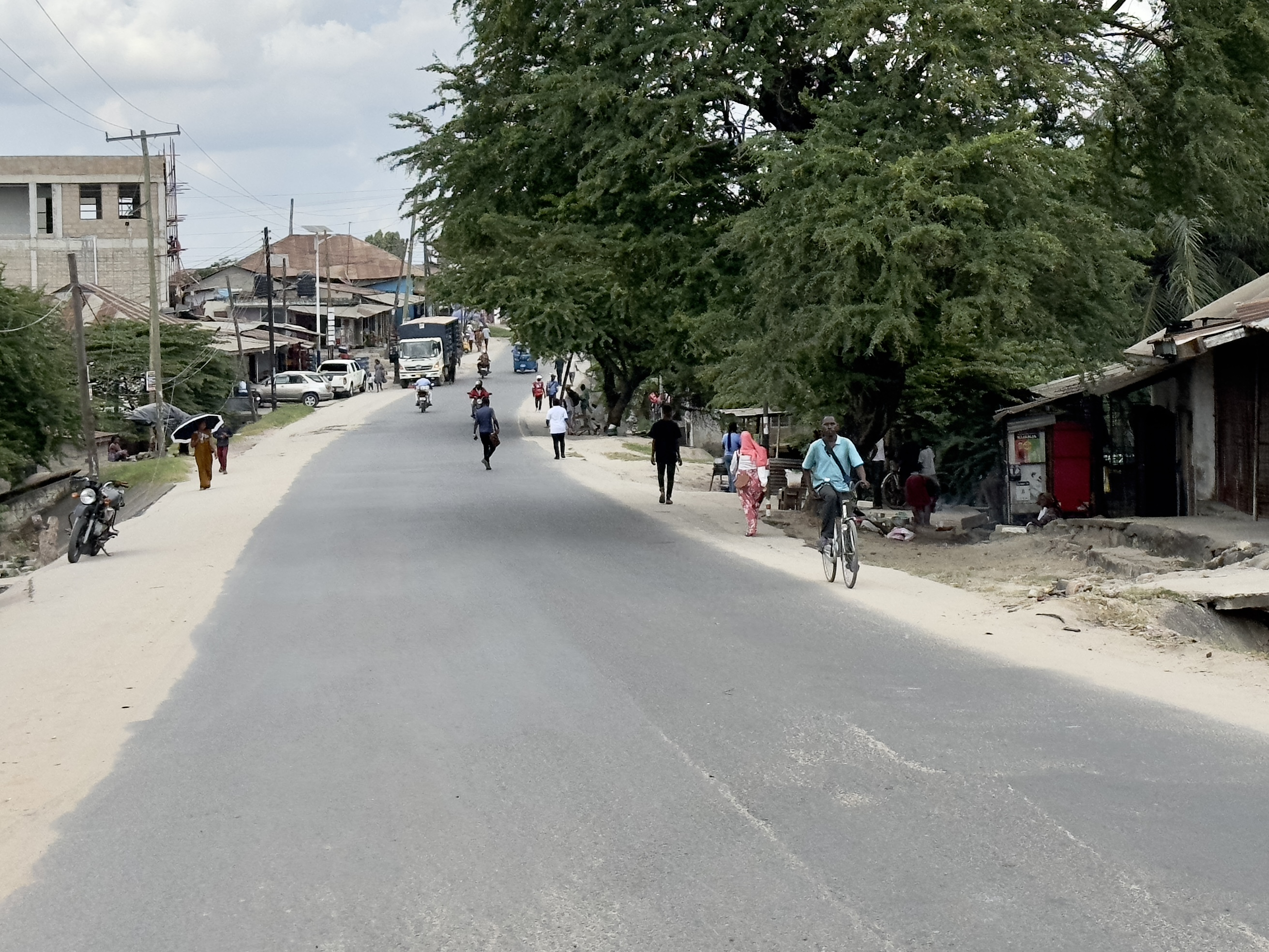
- From top to bottom: Mburahati street scsne
- Interactive map of Mburahati
- Coordinates: 6°48′50.4″S 39°14′22.56″E
- Country: Tanzania
- Region: Dar es Salaam Region
- District: Ubungo District

Area
  - Total: 1.1 km^{2} (0.42 sq mi)

Population (2012)
  - Total: 34,123

Ethnic groups
  - Settler: Swahili
  - Ancestral: Zaramo
- Tanzanian Postal Code: 16101

Mburahati (Kata ya Mburahati, in Swahili) is an administrative ward in Ubungo District of the Dar es Salaam Region in Tanzania. Makurumla borders the ward to the north. The ward is bordered by Mzimuni of Kinondoni MC to the east. The Kinondoni ward of Kigogo is to the south. Mabibo is to the west. According to the 2012 census, the ward has a total population of 34,123.

== Administration ==
The postal code for Mburahati Ward is 16101. The ward is divided into the following neighborhoods (Mitaa):

- Barafu
- Kisiwani

- National Housing

=== Government ===
Like every other ward in the country, the ward has local government offices based on the population served. The Mburahati Ward administration building houses a court as per the Ward Tribunal Act of 1988, including other vital departments for the administration of the ward. The ward has the following administration offices:

- Mburahati Police Station
- Mburahati Government Office (Afisa Mtendaji)
- Mburahati Ward Tribunal (Baraza La Kata) is a Department inside Ward Government Office

In the local government system of Tanzania, the ward is the smallest democratic unit. Each ward comprises a committee of eight elected council members, including a chairperson, one salaried officer (with no voting rights), and an executive officer. One-third of seats are reserved for women councilors.

== Demographics ==
The ward serves as the Zaramo's ancestral home along with a sizable chunk of the district. The ward changed over time into a cosmopolitan ward as the city grew.

== Education and health ==
=== Education ===
The ward is home to these educational institutions:

- Mburahati Primary School
- Barafu Primary School
- Muungano Primary School
- Mburahati Secondary School

=== Healthcare ===
The ward is home to the following health institutions:

- Mburahati Health Center
- TM Dispensary
