= Kimanga =

Ward in Ilala District, Dar es Salaam Region

Kimanga Kata ya Kimanga (Swahili)
- Ward of Ilala District
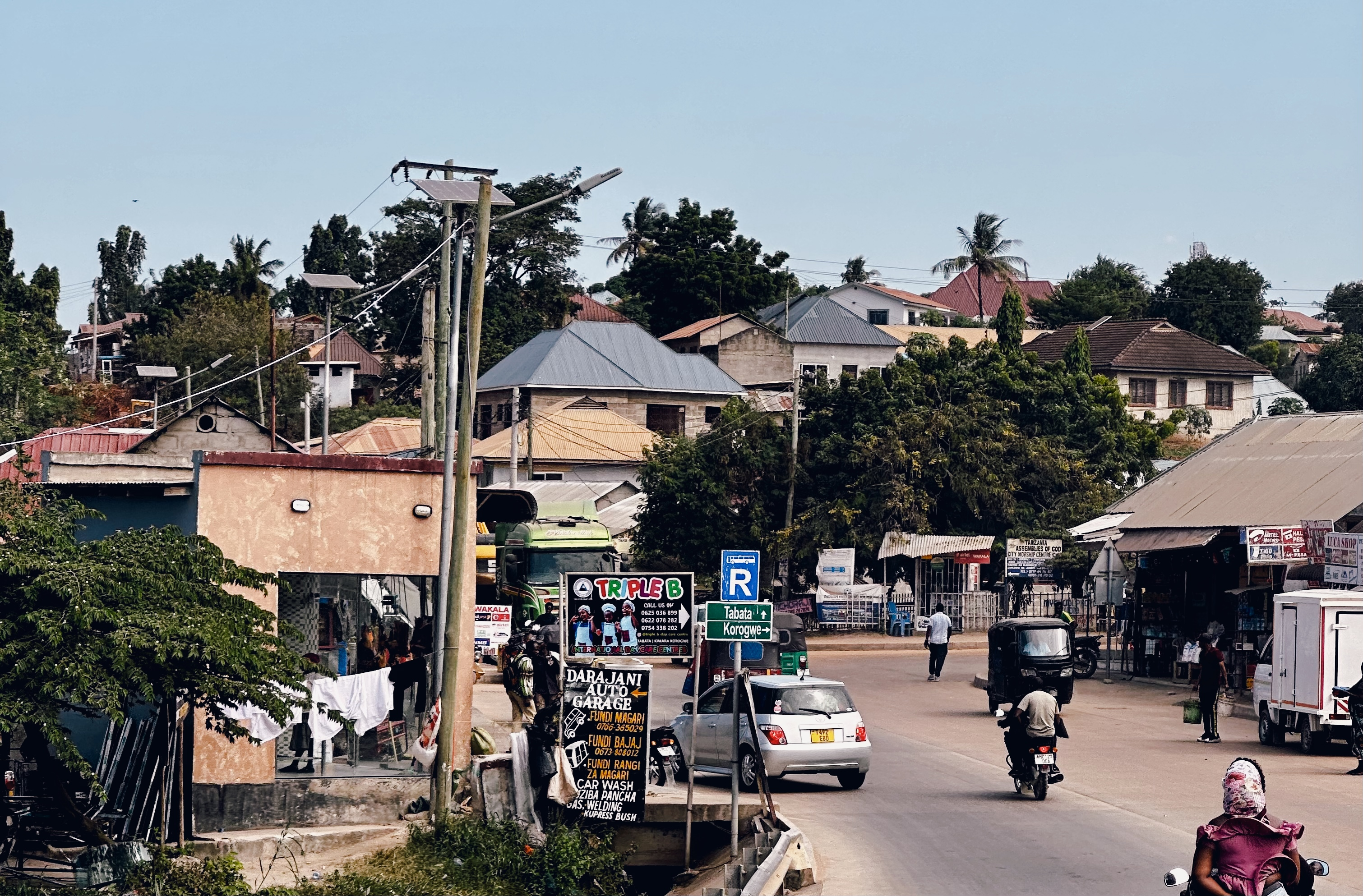
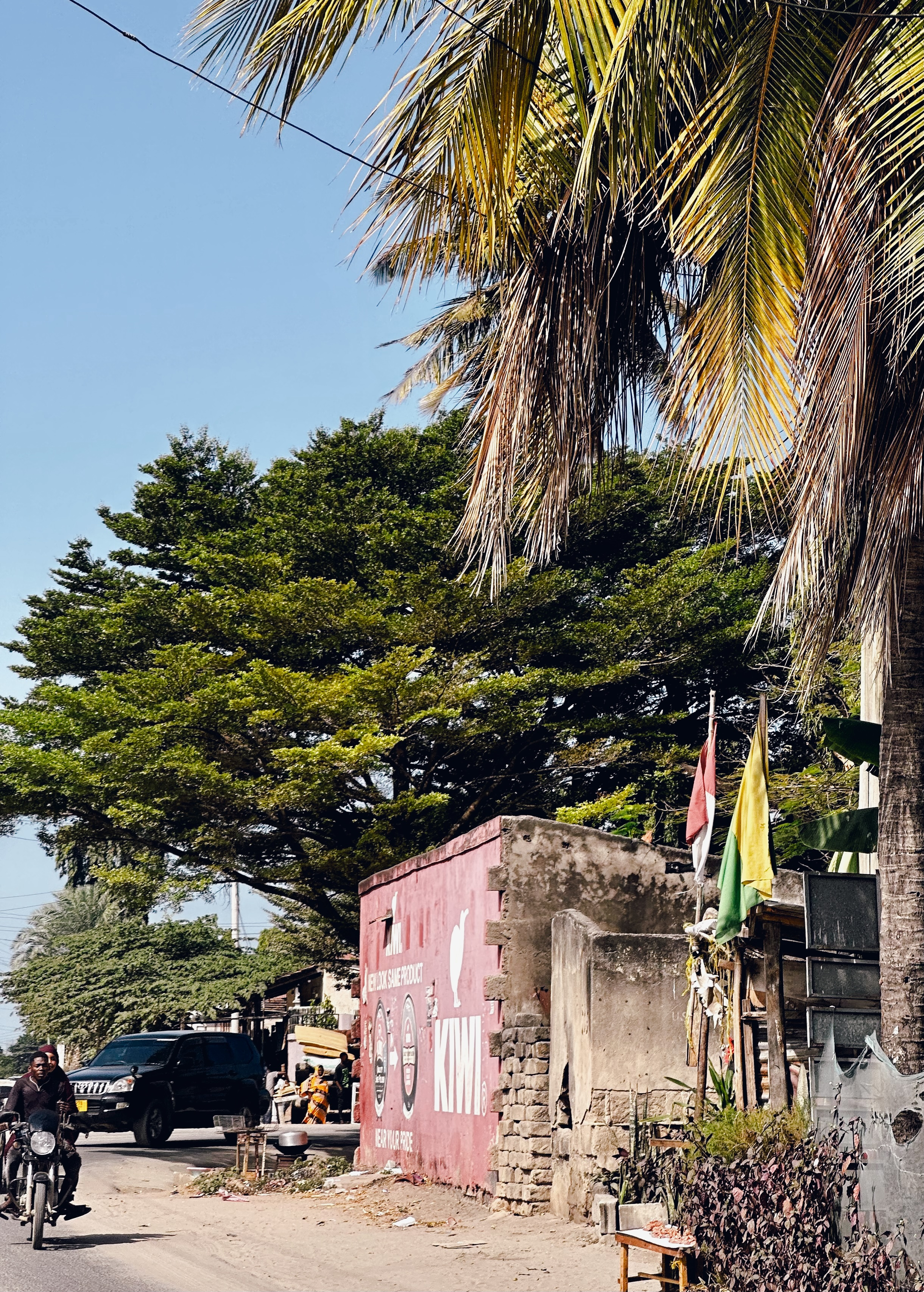
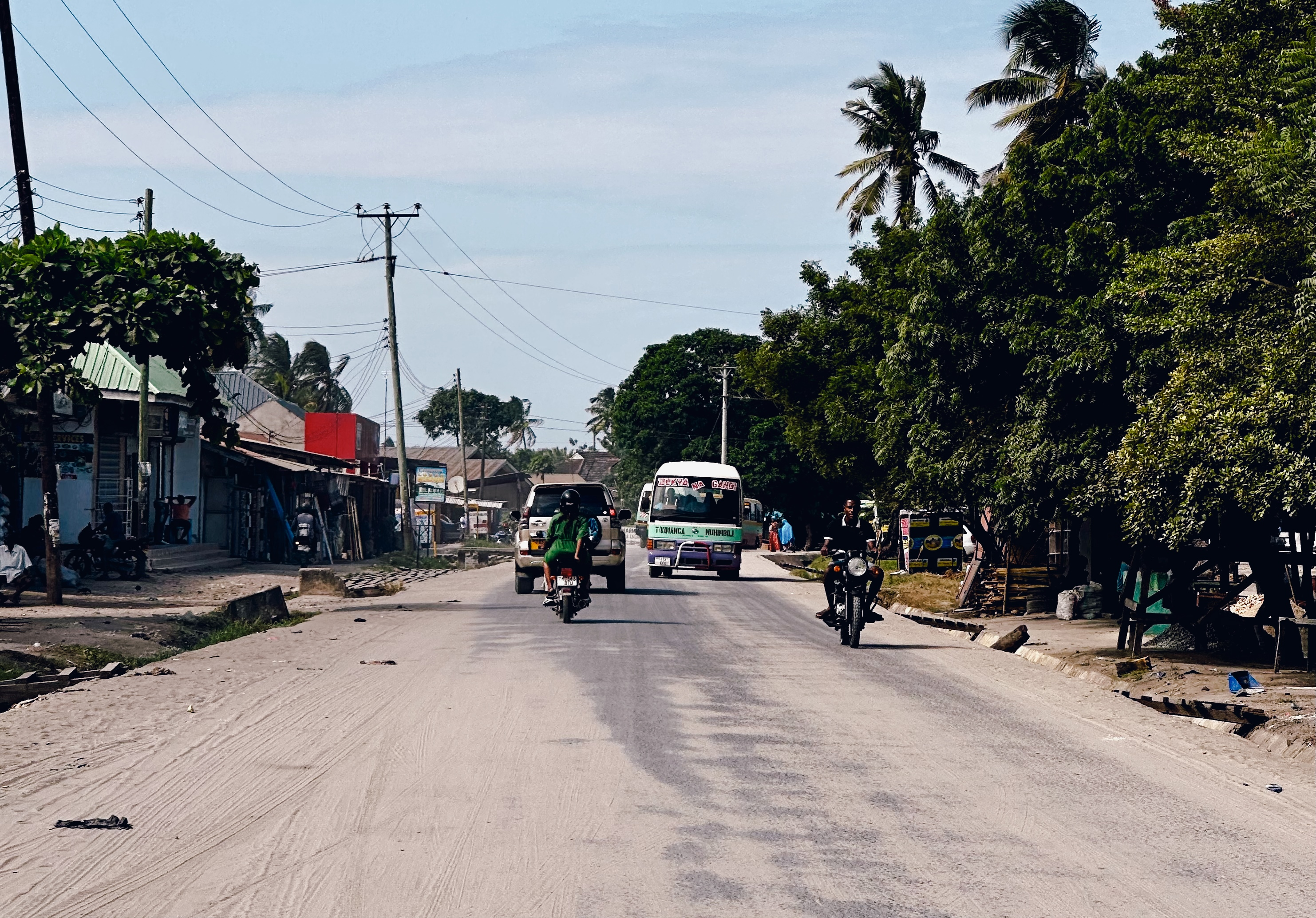
- From top to bottom: Scene in Kimanga ward, Street detail in Kimanga and road through Kimanga
- Interactive map of Kimanga
- Coordinates: 6°49′37.56″S 39°12′6.48″E
- Country: Tanzania
- Region: Dar es Salaam Region
- District: Ilala District

Area
  - Total: 9.3 km^{2} (3.6 sq mi)

Population (2022)
  - Total: 50,340

Ethnic groups
  - Settler: Swahili
  - Ancestral: Zaramo
- Tanzanian Postal Code: 12104

Kimanga (Kata ya Kimanga, in Swahili) is an administrative ward of the Ilala Municipical Council of the Dar es Salaam Region in Tanzania. The wards of Ubungo MC are bordered to the north by the wards of Makuburi and Kimara. The ward is bordered by Segerea to the south and Tabata to the east. Kinyerezi borders the ward on its western side. According to the 2022 census, the ward has a total population of 50,340.

== Administration ==
The postal code for the Kimanga ward is 12104. The ward is divided into the following neighborhoods (Mitaa):

- Banebane
- Kihimbwa
- Kimanga
- Kimanga Darajani

- Sokoine
- Tembomgwaza
- Twiga

=== Government ===
The ward, like every other ward in the country, has local government offices based on the population served.The Kimanga Ward administration building houses a court as per the Ward Tribunal Act of 1988, including other vital departments for the administration the ward. The ward has the following administration offices:

- Kimanga Police Station
- Kimanga Government Office (Afisa Mtendaji)
- Kimanga Ward Tribunal (Baraza La Kata) is a Department inside Ward Government Office

In the local government system of Tanzania, the ward is the smallest democratic unit. Each ward is composed of a committee of eight elected council members which include a chairperson, one salaried officer (with no voting rights), and an executive officer. One-third of seats are reserved for women councillors.

== Demographics ==
The ward serves as the Zaramo people's ancestral home, along with much of the district. As the city developed throughout time, the ward became into a cosmopolitan ward. In total, 50,340 people called the ward home in 2022.

== Education and health ==
=== Education ===
The ward is home to these educational institutions

- Sabisa Primary School
- St. Andrew's Primary School, Kimanga
- Kimanga Secondary School
- Wazazi Secondary School
- Kamene Secondary School
- Nobo College of Pharmacy, Kimanga

=== Healthcare ===
The ward is home to the following health institutions:

- Jojo Polyclinic
- JPM Health Center, Kimanga
- Buguruni Health Center
