= Segerea =

Ward of Ilala District, Dar es Salaam Region

Segerea Kata ya Segerea (Swahili)
- Ward of Ilala District
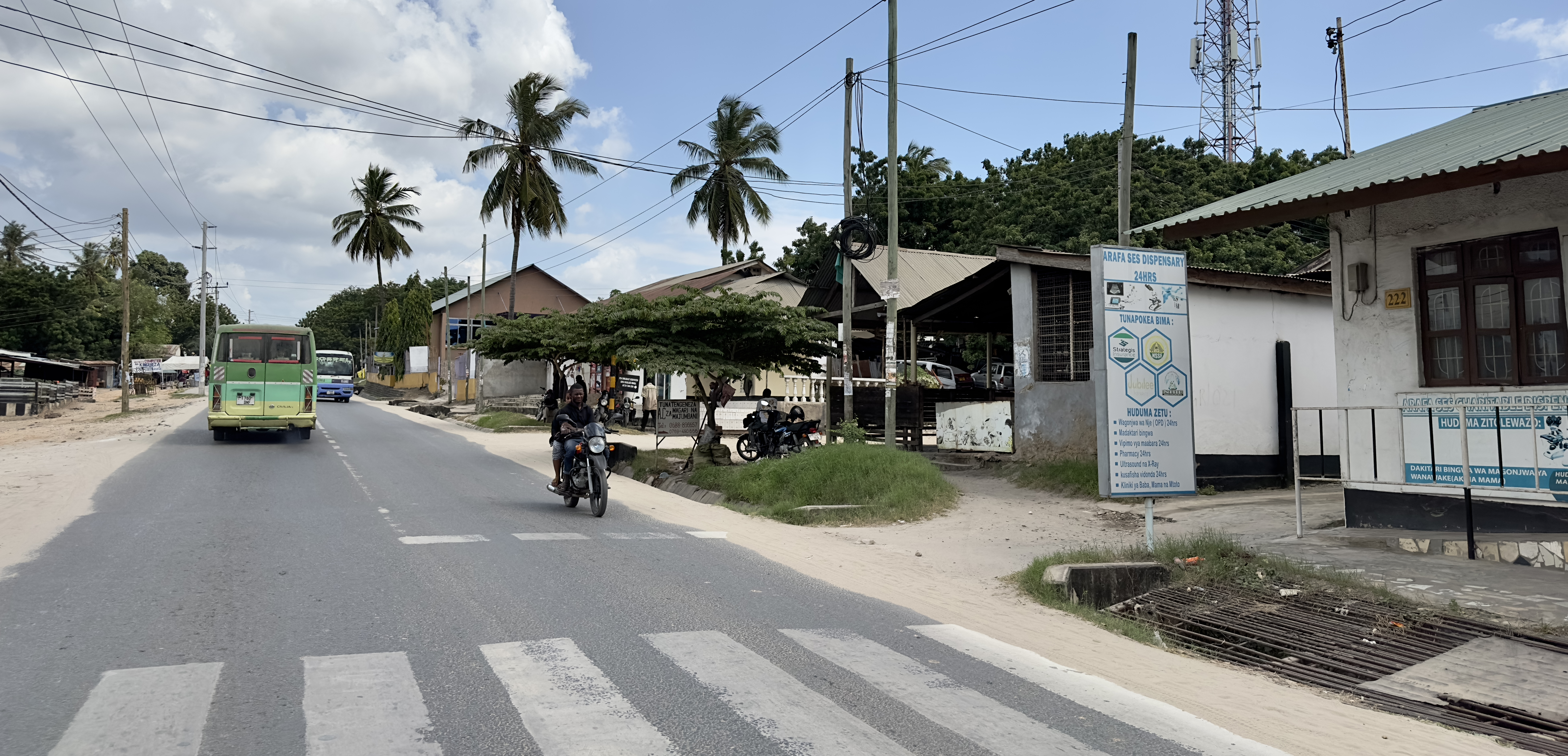
- From top to bottom: Street scene in Segerea ward & building in Segerea ward
- Interactive map of Segerea
- Coordinates: 6°50′37.32″S 39°12′5.04″E
- Country: Tanzania
- Region: Dar es Salaam Region
- District: Ilala District

Area
  - Total: 9.6 km^{2} (3.7 sq mi)

Population (2012)
  - Total: 83,315

Ethnic groups
  - Settler: Swahili
  - Ancestral: Zaramo
- Tanzanian Postal Code: 12105

Segerea (Kata ya Segerea, in Swahili) is an administrative ward of the Ilala Municipical Council of the Dar es Salaam Region in Tanzania. Kimanga forms the ward's northern boundary. Tabata borders the ward to the east, and Vingunguti and Kipawa border it to the south, through Kinyerezi, to the west. According to the 2012 census, the ward has a total population of 83,315.

== Administration ==
The postal code for the Segerea ward is 12105. The ward is divided into the following neighborhoods (Mitaa):

- Mfaume
- Mgombani

- Segerea
- Ugombolwa

=== Government ===
The ward, like every other ward in the country, has local government offices based on the population served.The Segerea Ward administration building houses a court as per the Ward Tribunal Act of 1988, including other vital departments for the administration the ward. The ward has the following administration offices:

- Segerea Police Station
- Segerea Government Office (Afisa Mtendaji)
- Segerea Ward Tribunal (Baraza La Kata) is a Department inside Ward Government Office

In the local government system of Tanzania, the ward is the smallest democratic unit. Each ward is composed of a committee of eight elected council members which include a chairperson, one salaried officer (with no voting rights), and an executive officer. One-third of seats are reserved for women councillors.

== Demographics ==
The ward serves as the Zaramo people's ancestral home, along with much of the district. As the city developed throughout time, the ward became into a cosmopolitan ward. In total, 83,315 people called the ward home in 2012.

== Education and health ==
=== Education ===
The ward is home to these educational institutions

- Segerea Primary School
- Segerea Adventist Primary School
- Bariadi Primary School, Segerea
- Genius King Primary School
- Maendeleo Primary School
- Patmo Junior Primary School
- St. Rosalia Primary School
- Harvard East Africa Primary School
- Fountain Gate Primary School
- New Generation Primary School
- Tusiime Primary School
- St. Maxmillian Secondary School
- Migombani Secondary School
- Tusiime Secondary School
- Raida Secondary School
- Christ the King Secondary School

=== Healthcare ===
The ward is home to the following health institutions:

- Segerea Health Center
- Huruma Health Center
- St. Anna Dispensary, Segerea
