= Mwalimu Nyerere Memorial House =

- Nyumba ya Kumbukumbu ya Mwalimu Nyerere
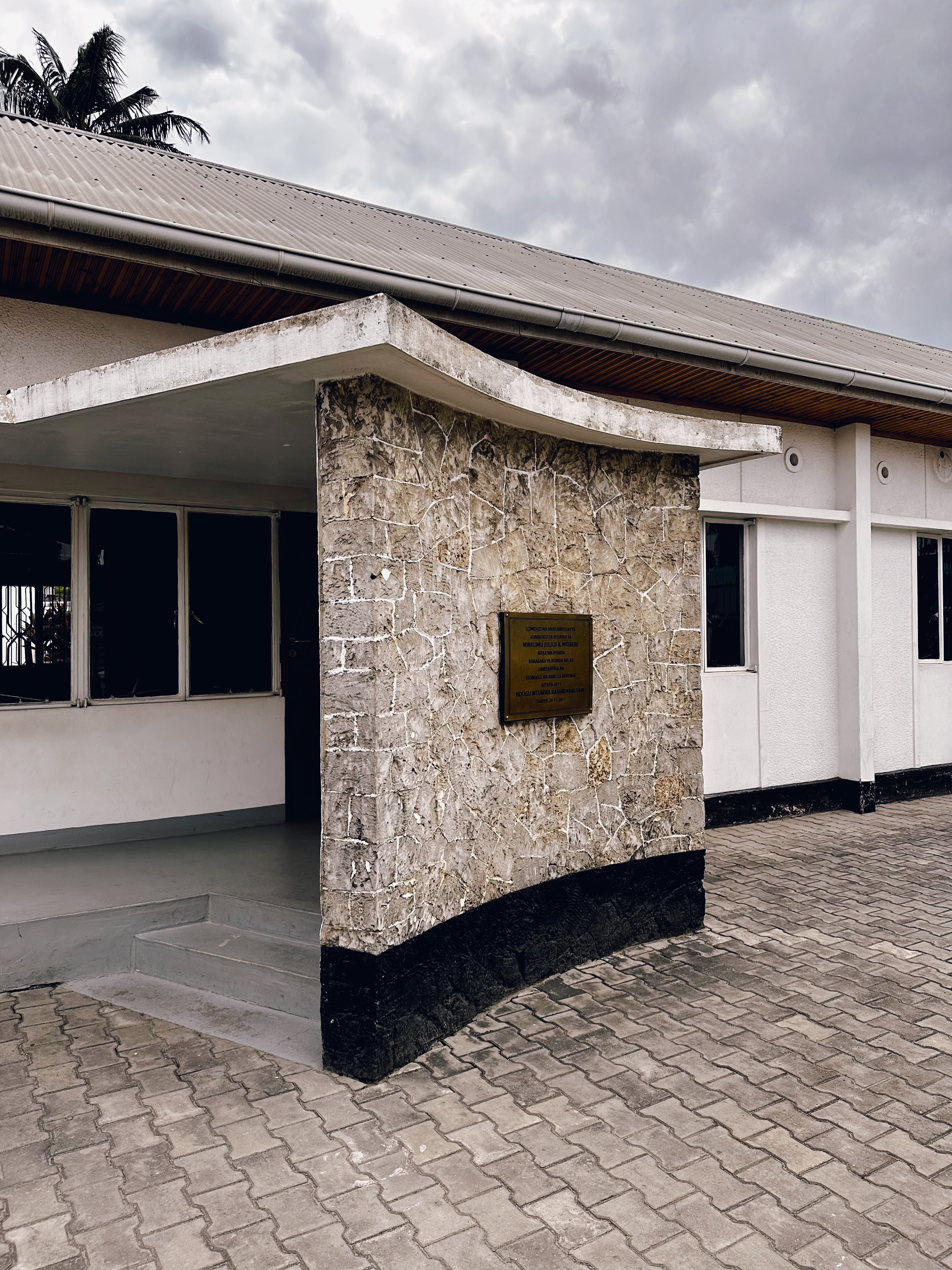
- Front of the house, at Mwalimu Nyerere Memorial House, Mzimuni, Kinondoni MC, Dar es Salaam
- Location: Mzimuni, Kinondoni MC, Dar es Salaam Region in Tanzania.
- Coordinates: 6°48′36.36″S 39°15′21.6″E
- Owner: TANAPA
- Website: www.nmt.go.tz

Mwalimu Nyerere Memorial House (Swahili: Nyumba ya Kumbukumbu ya Mwalimu Nyerere) is a museum dedicated to the Tanzanian founding father Julius Nyerere. It is located in Mzimuni ward of Kinondoni District in the Dar es Salaam Region of Tanzania. Specifically, on Makumbusho street, Plot No. 62, House No. 2, Mzimuni ward.

== History ==
One of the first homes Mwalimu J.K. Nyerere possessed during the struggle for independence was Mwalimu Nyerere Memorial House in Magomeni (Now Mzimuni). The first president of Tanganyika lived in this house during the struggle for independence. It was built by him in the 1950s after he resigned from teaching at St. Francis school, today known as Pugu Secondary school. This mansion was the location of every covert gathering and discussion regarding methods to end colonial power. The Mwalimu Nyerere Memorial House is situated on a street that was home to many of the pioneers who helped bring about the independence to the country, including Abasi Kandoro, Amiri Abeid Kalluta, Rashid Kawawa, Mzee Songambele, Lucy Lameck, John Rupia, and others.

== Collections ==
The museum is filled with a variety of antiques (furniture) that Mwalimu's family used while residing in this home, including the bed that Mwalimu used, a radio, a sofa seat, a dining table and chair, many Mwalimu quotations, stitching, and charcoal. Mama Maria's cooking utensils, the iron that Mwalimu's guardian used to sew and iron Mwalimu's clothing, and a copper water pot.

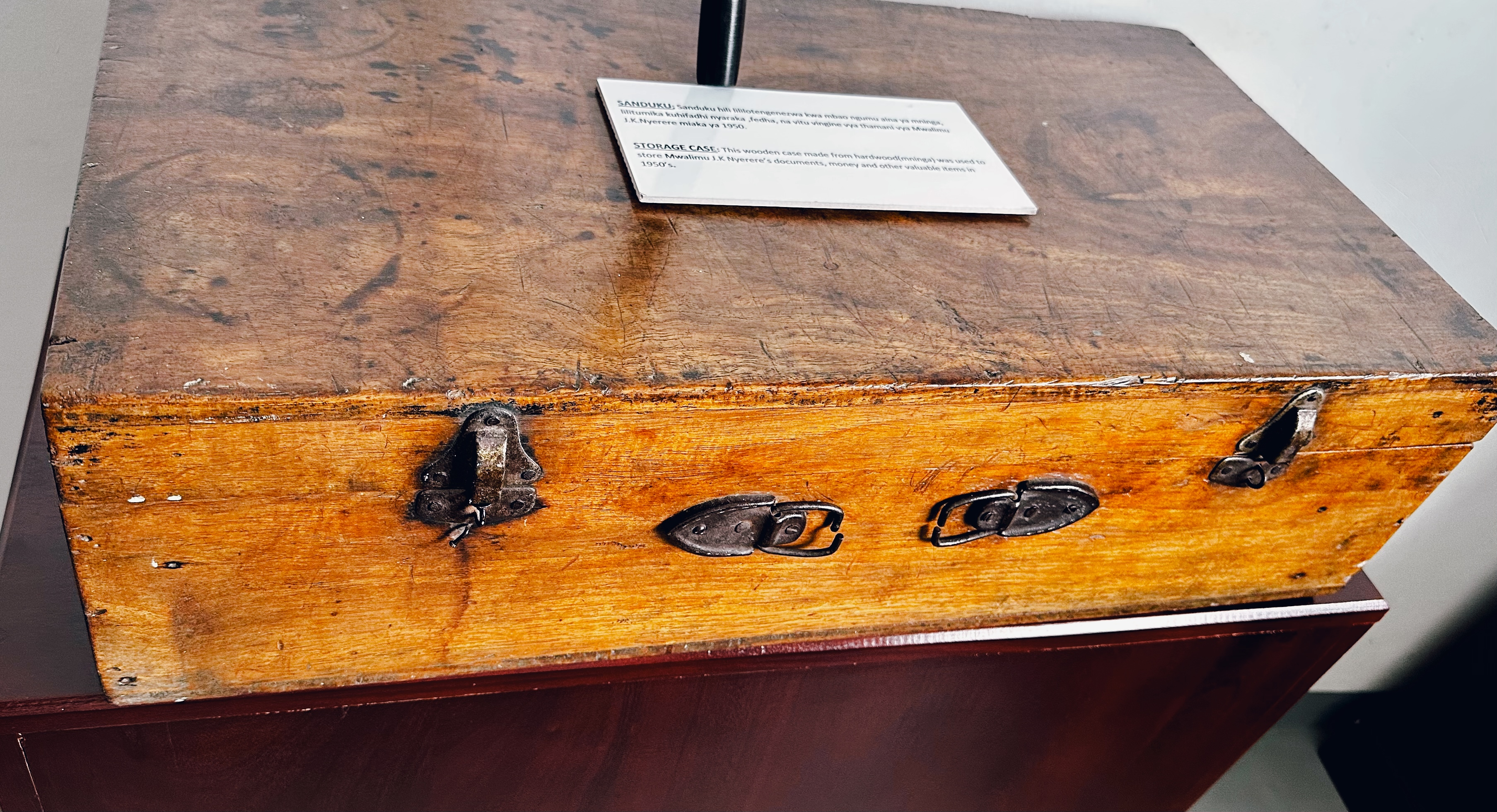
Woodencase at Mwalim Nyerere Memorial House, Mzimuni, Kinondoni MC, Dar es Salaam

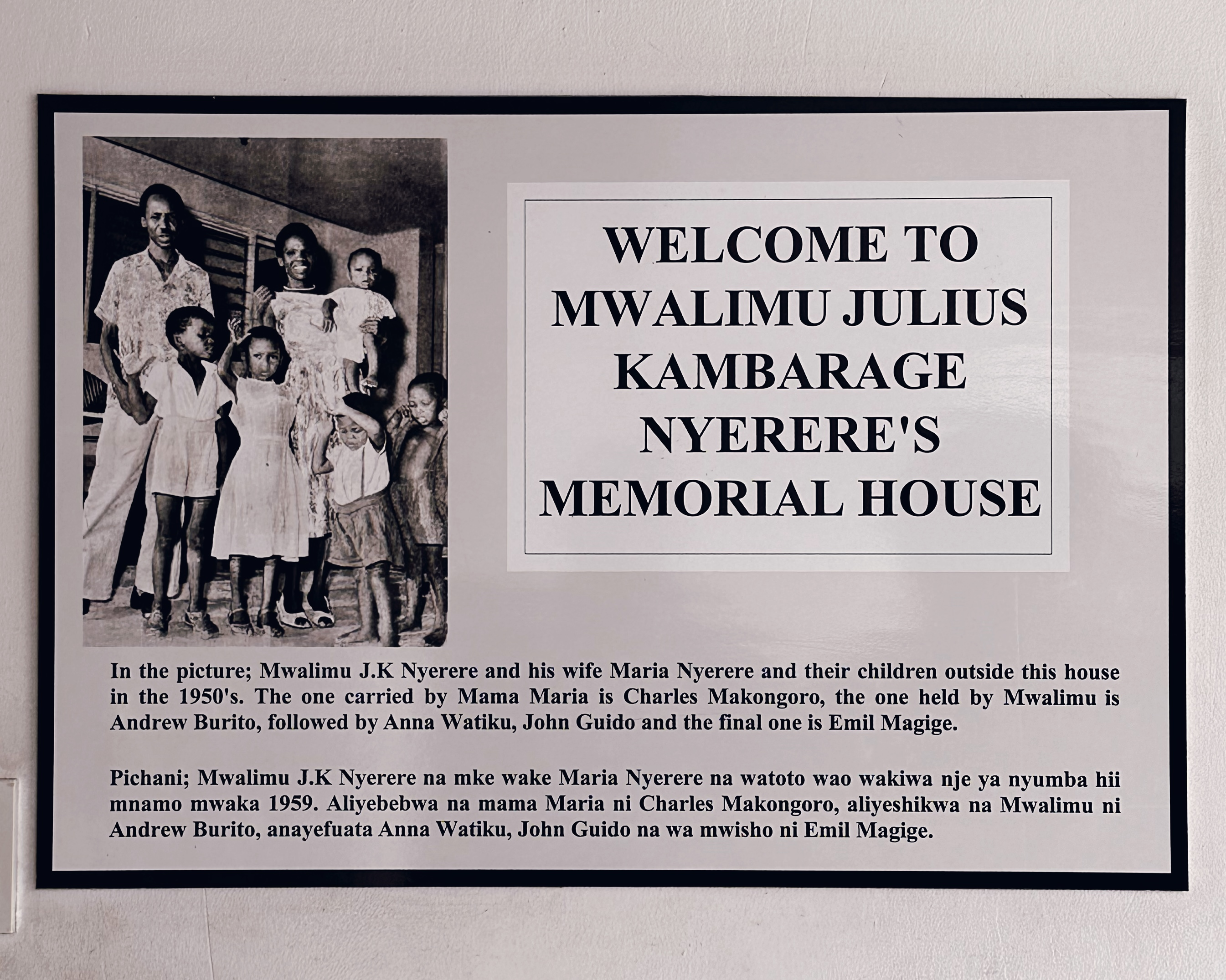
Description at Mwalimu Nyerere Memorial House, Mzimuni, Kinondoni MC, Dar es Salaam

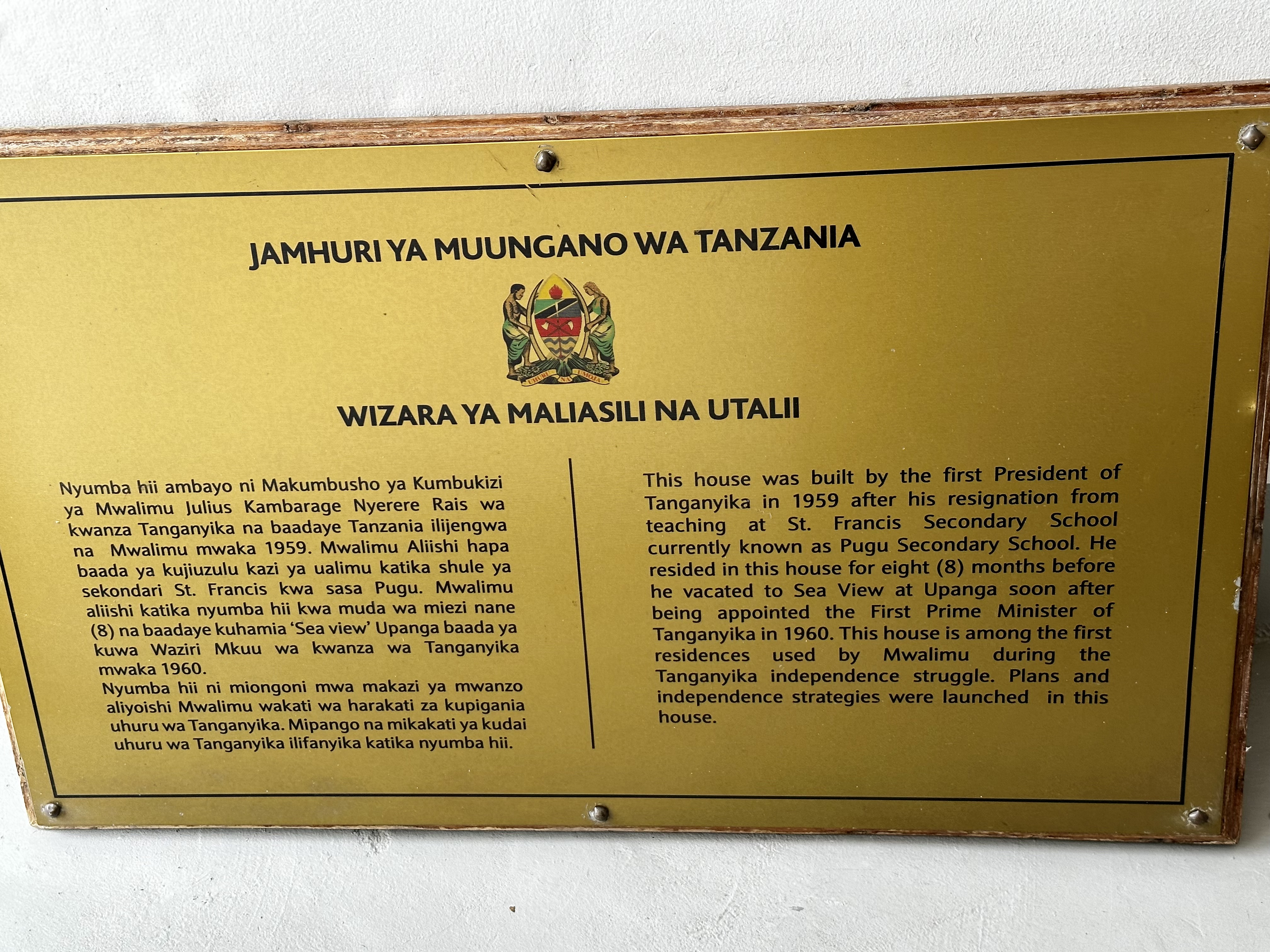
Plate at Mwalimu Nyerere Memorial House, Mzimuni, Kinondoni MC, Dar es Salaam

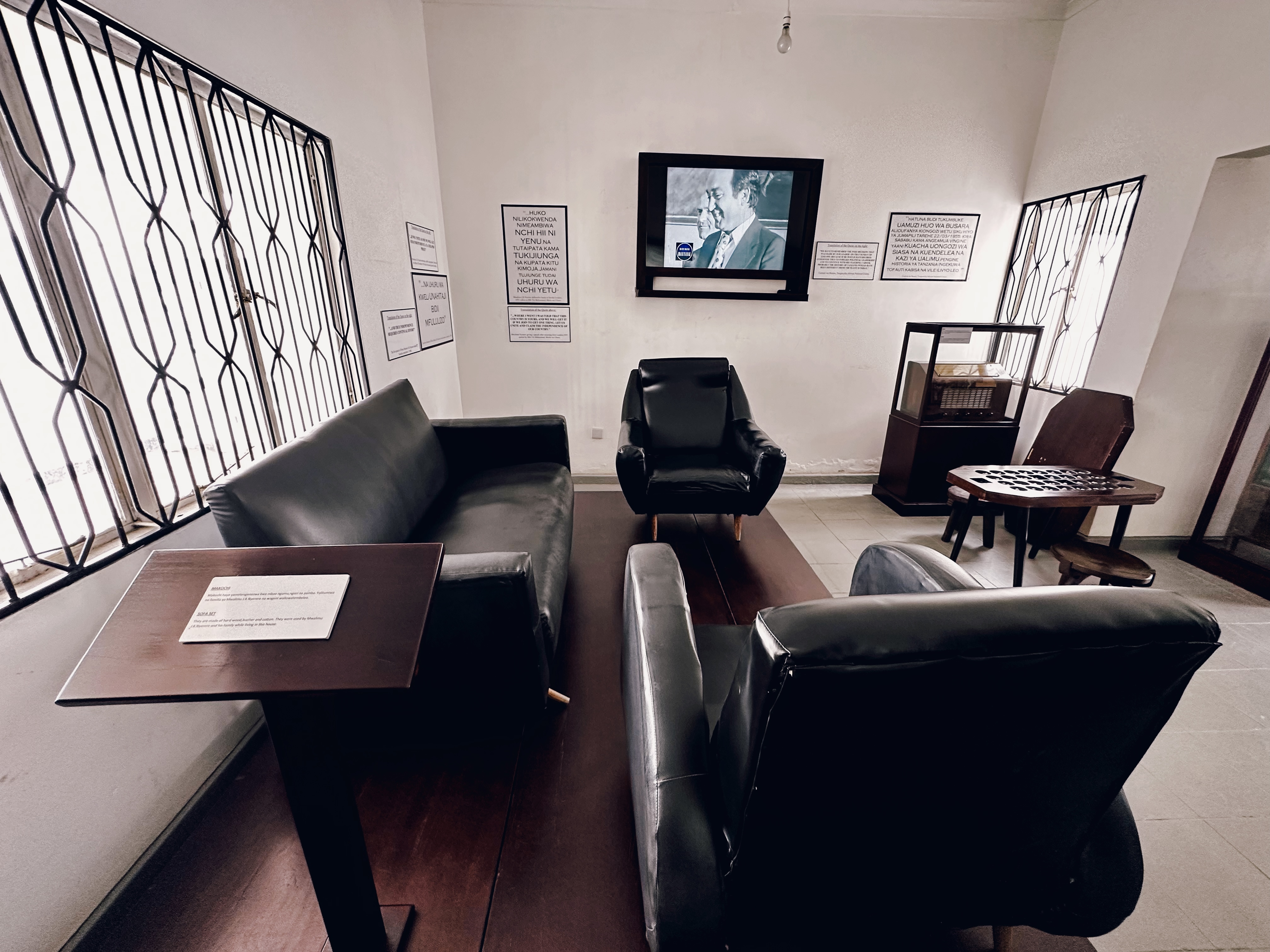
Living room at Mwalimu Nyerere Memorial House, Mzimuni, Kinondoni MC, Dar es Salaam

== See also ==
- List of museums in Tanzania
