= Mabibo =

Ward of Ubungo District, Dar es Salaam Region

Mabibo Kata ya Mabibo (Swahili)
- Ward of Ubungo District
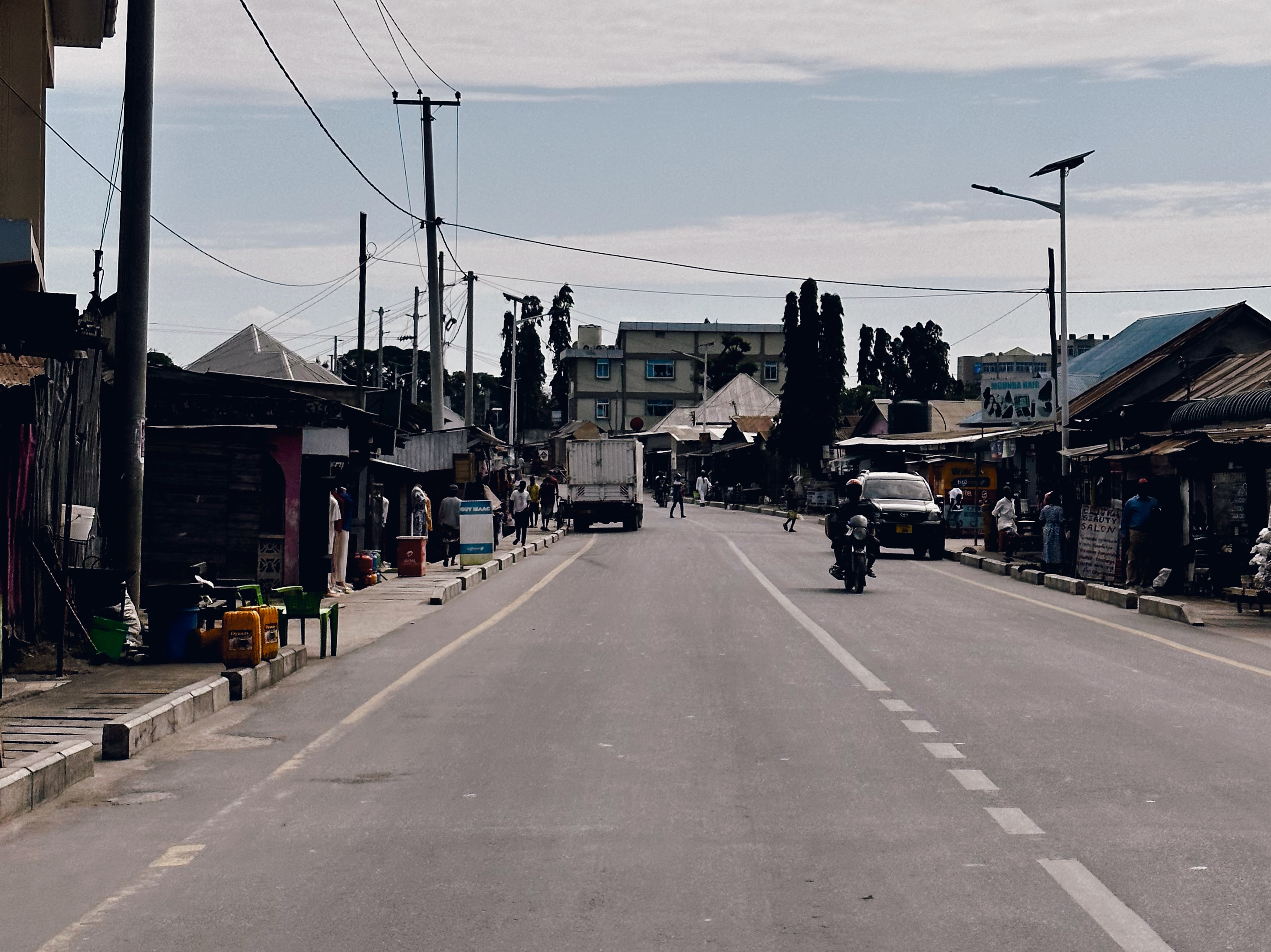
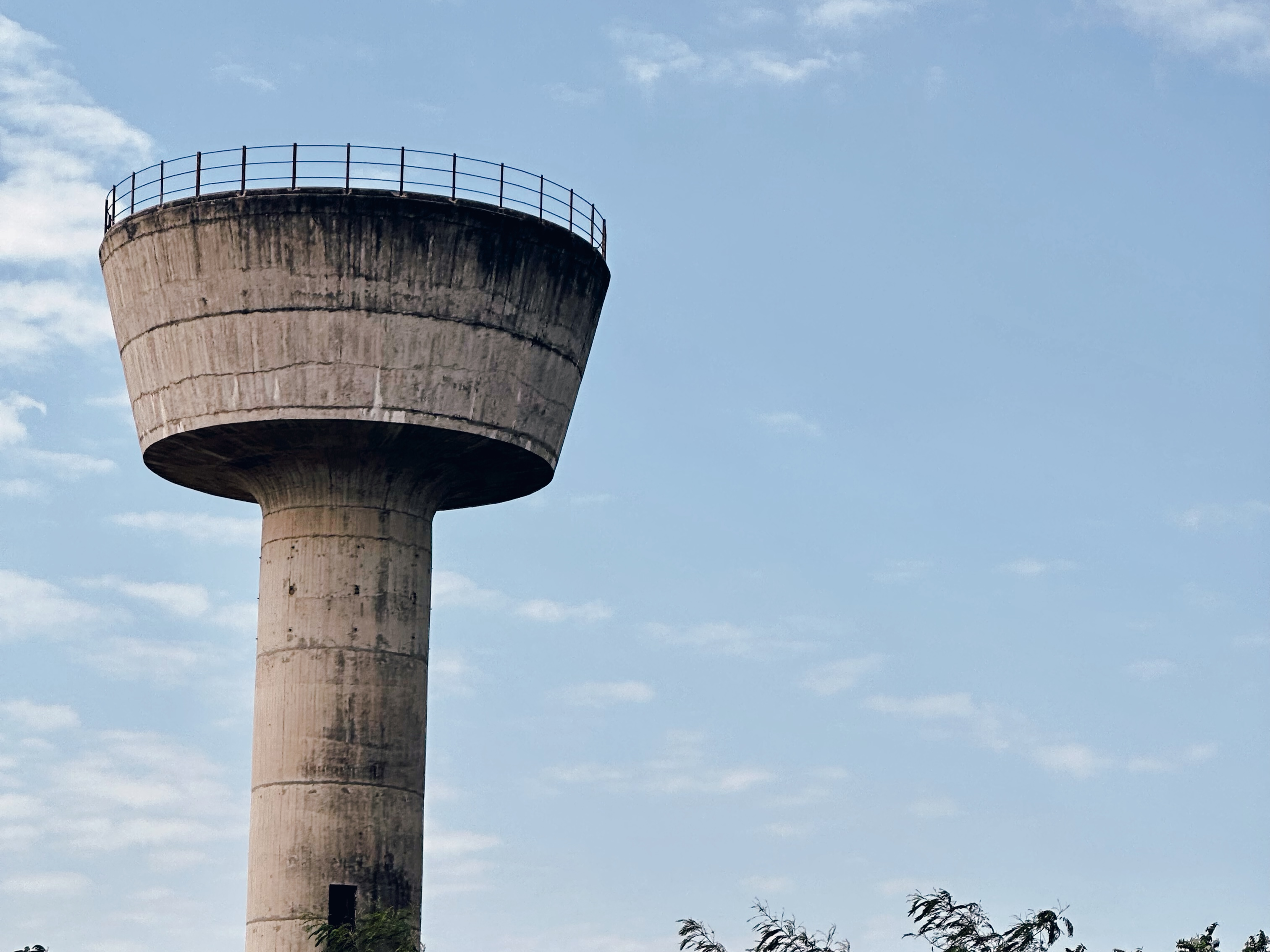
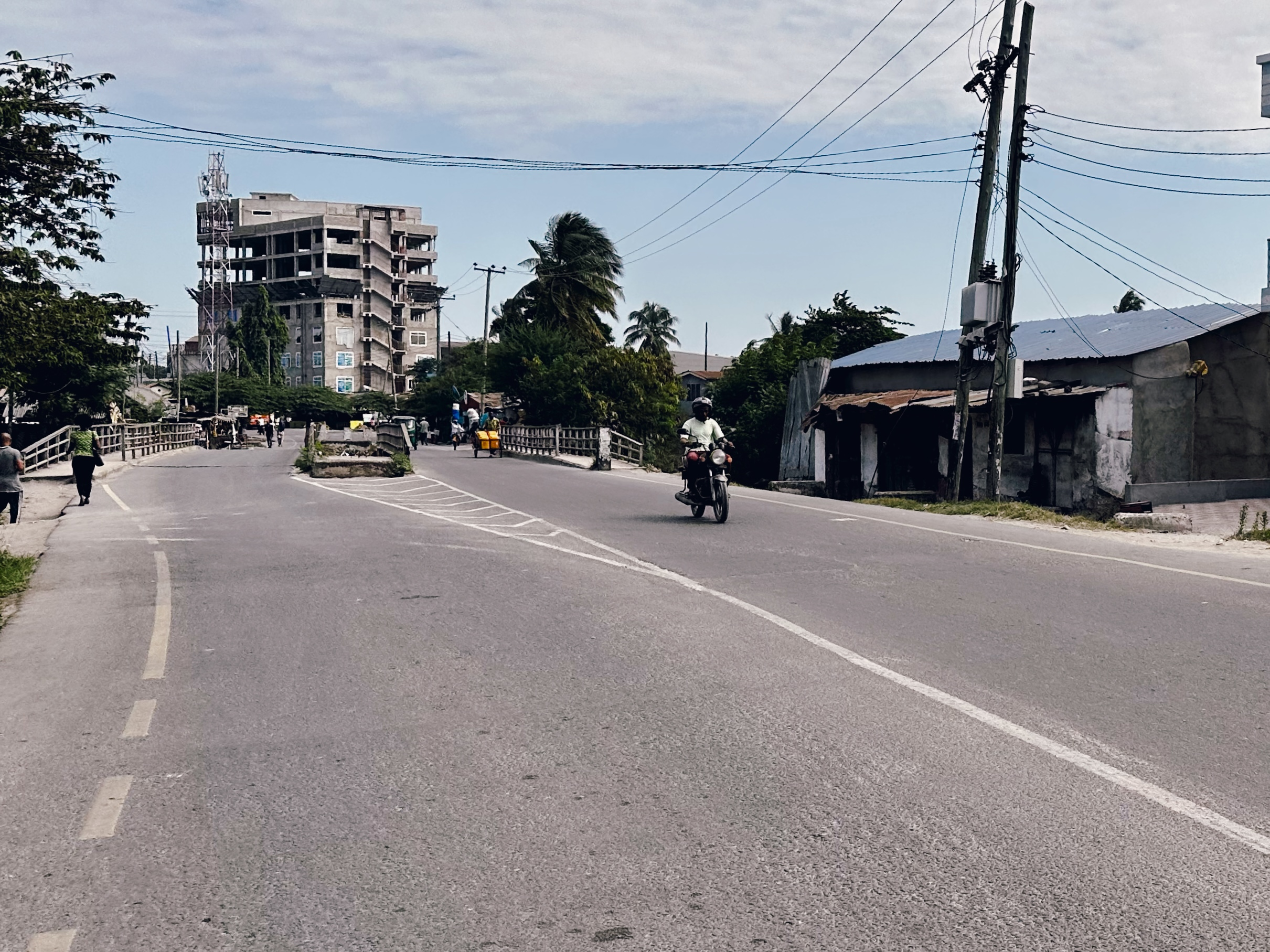
- From top to bottom: Street scene in Mabibo, Water tower in Mabibo & Street in Mabibo
- Interactive map of Mabibo
- Coordinates: 6°48′32.76″S 39°13′18.84″E
- Country: Tanzania
- Region: Dar es Salaam Region
- District: Ubungo District

Area
  - Total: 4.0 km^{2} (1.5 sq mi)

Population (2012)
  - Total: 85,735

Ethnic groups
  - Settler: Swahili
  - Ancestral: Zaramo
- Tanzanian Postal Code: 16109

Mabibo (Kata ya Mabibo, in Swahili) is an administrative ward in Ubungo District of the Dar es Salaam Region in Tanzania. Manzese and Ubungo border the ward to the north. Makurumla and Mburahati border the ward to the east. Kigogo and Tabata, the latter of which is in Ilala and former of Kinondoni, are to the south. The Makuburi ward is to the west. According to the 2012 census, the ward has a total population of 85,735.

== Administration ==
The postal code for Mabibo Ward is 16109. The ward is divided into the following neighborhoods (Mitaa):

- Azimio
- Jitegemee
- Kanuni

- Mabibo
- Mabibo Farasi
- Matokeo
- Snake garden

=== Government ===
Like every other ward in the country, the ward has local government offices based on the population served. The Mabibo Ward administration building houses a court as per the Ward Tribunal Act of 1988, including other vital departments for the administration of the ward. The ward has the following administration offices:

- Mabibo Ward Police Station
- Mabibo Ward Government Office (Afisa Mtendaji)
- Mabibo Ward Tribunal (Baraza La Kata) is a Department inside Ward Government Office

In the local government system of Tanzania, the ward is the smallest democratic unit. Each ward comprises a committee of eight elected council members, including a chairperson, one salaried officer (with no voting rights), and an executive officer. One-third of seats are reserved for women councilors.

== Demographics ==
The ward serves as the Zaramo's ancestral home along with a sizable chunk of the district. The ward changed over time into a cosmopolitan ward as the city grew.

== Education and health ==
=== Education ===
The ward is home to these educational institutions:

- Mpakani Primary School
- Mabibo Secondary School
- Kawawa Primary School
- Malaika Primary School
- Jeshini Primary School, Mabibo
- Green acres Mambibo Primary School

=== Healthcare ===
The ward is home to the following health institutions:

- Mabibo Health Center
- Mafarsa Muleba Health Center
- Mabibo Hospital
- Mico Farasi Health Center
- MCDIT Health Center
- DEA Eye Center, Mabibo
- Oasis Health Center, Mabibo
