= Mzimuni =

Ward of Kinondoni District, Dar es Salaam Region

Mzimuni Kata ya Mzimuni (Swahili)
- Ward of Kinondoni District
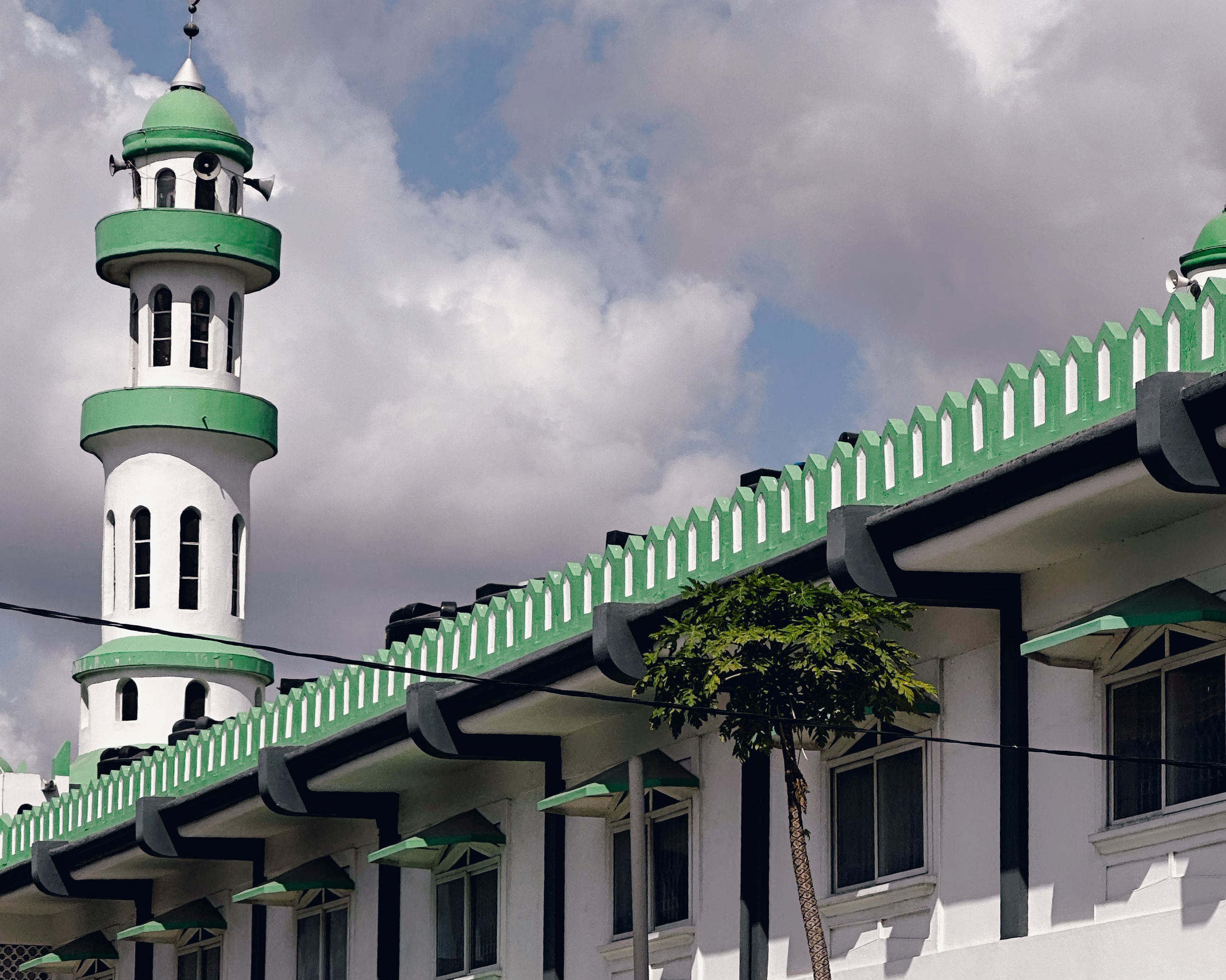
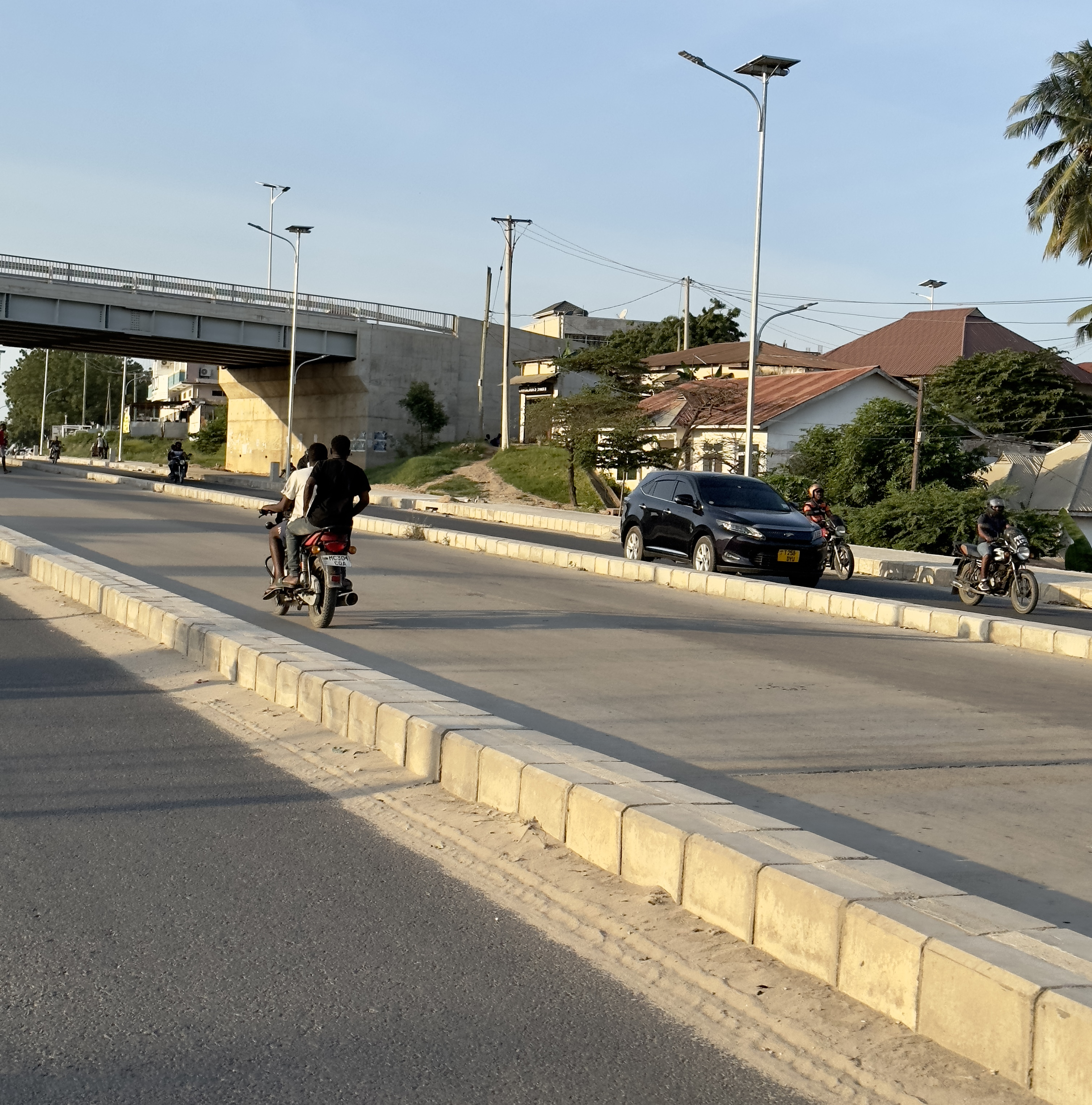
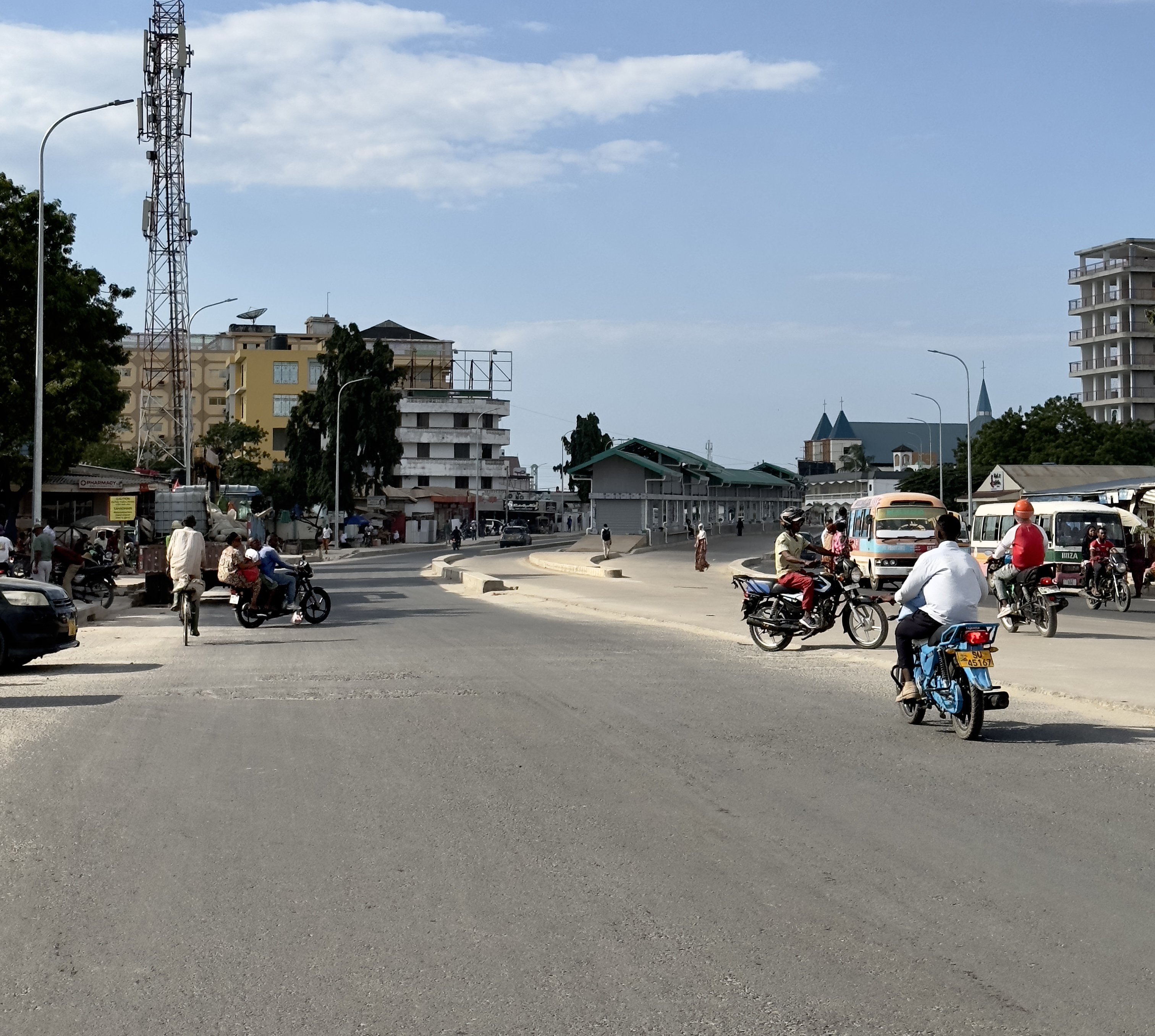
- From top to bottom: Kichangani Mosque of Mzimuni, Kiwawa rd in Mzimuni & Street scene in Mzimuni
- Interactive map of Mzimuni
- Coordinates: 6°48′36.36″S 39°15′21.6″E
- Country: Tanzania
- Region: Dar es Salaam Region
- District: Kinondoni District

Area
  - Total: 1.2 km^{2} (0.46 sq mi)

Population (2012)
  - Total: 21,486

Ethnic groups
  - Settler: Swahili
  - Ancestral: Zaramo
- Tanzanian Postal Code: 14102

Mzimuni (Kata ya Mzimuni, in Swahili) is an administrative ward in Kinondoni District of the Dar es Salaam Region in Tanzania. The ward's northern boundaries are formed by the wards of Ndugumbi and Magomeni. Upanga West and Jangwani wards of Ilala MC surround the ward on the east, and Kigogo ward borders it on the south. The Makurumla and Mburahati wards of Ubungo MC are to the west. The ward is home to the Mwalimu Nyerere Memorial House. In 2016 the Tanzania National Bureau of Statistics report there were 26,905 people in the ward, from 21,486 in 2012.

== Administration ==
The postal code for Mzimuni ward is 14102. The ward is divided into the following neighborhoods (Mitaa):

- Idrisa
- Makumbusho, Mzimuni

- Mtambani, Mzimuni
- Mwinyimkuu, Mzimuni

=== Government ===
The ward, like every other ward in the country, has local government offices based on the population served. The Mzimuni Ward administration building houses a court as per the Ward Tribunal Act of 1988, including other vital departments for the administration the ward. The ward has the following administration offices:

- Mzimuni Ward Police Station
- Mzimuni Ward Government Office (Afisa Mtendaji)
- Mzimuni Ward Tribunal (Baraza La Kata) is a Department inside Ward Government Office

In the local government system of Tanzania, the ward is the smallest democratic unit. Each ward is composed of a committee of eight elected council members which include a chairperson, one salaried officer (with no voting rights), and an executive officer. One-third of seats are reserved for women councillors.

== Demographics ==
The ward and a sizable chunk of the district were originally home to the Zaramo people. The ward evolved into an international community as the city grew. The ward is home to 21,486 residents.

== Education and health ==
=== Education ===
The ward is home to these educational institutions:

- Mzimuni Primary School
- Mzimuni Secondary School
- Shamsiye Schools

=== Healthcare ===
The ward is home to the following health institutions:

- Mikumi Hospital, Mzimuni
- Apala Health Center
- Dr. Tamba Life Care Health Clinic, Mzimuni
