= Kigogo =

Ward of Kinondoni District, Dar es Salaam Region

Kigogo Kata ya Kigogo (Swahili)
- Ward of Kinondoni District
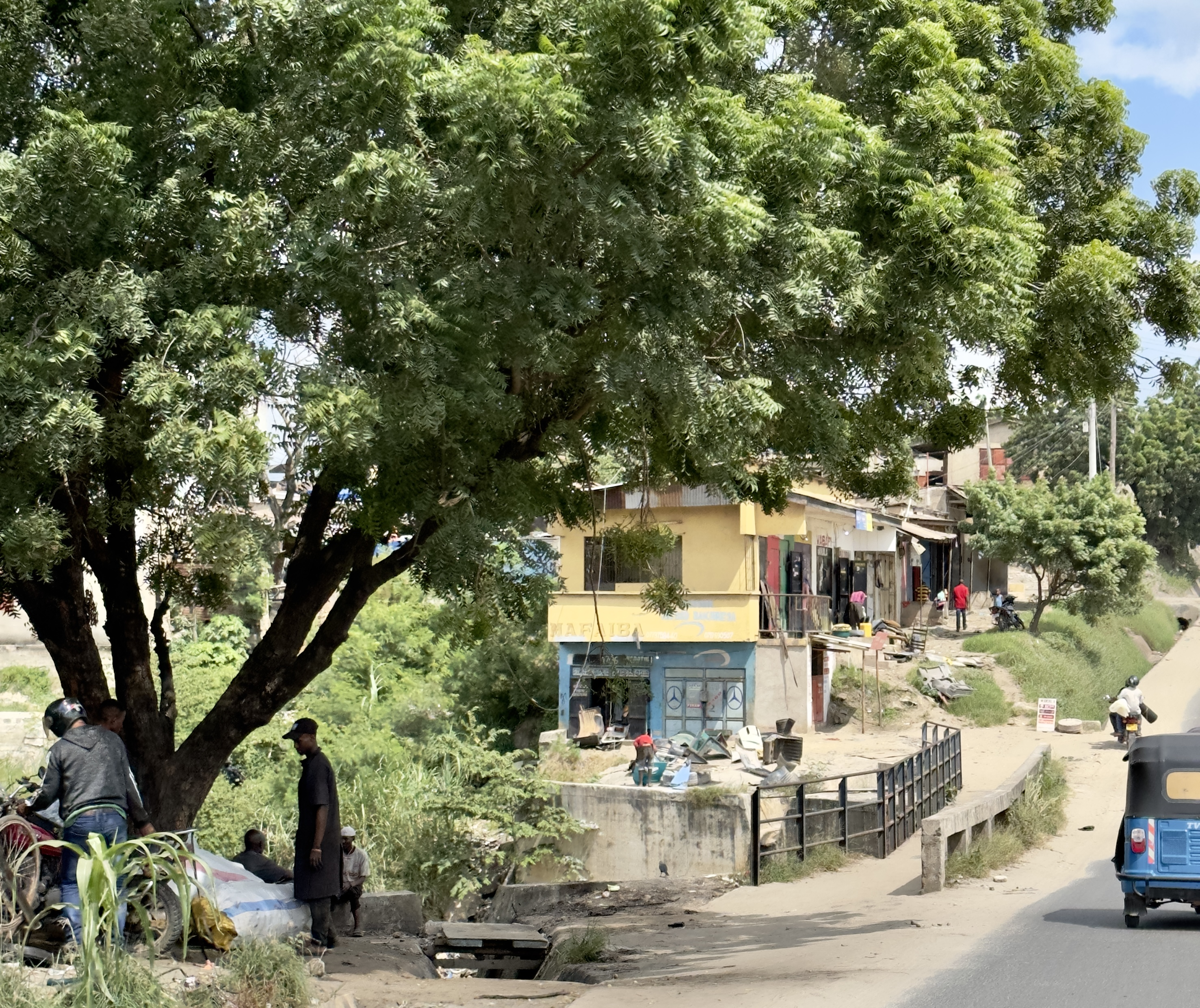
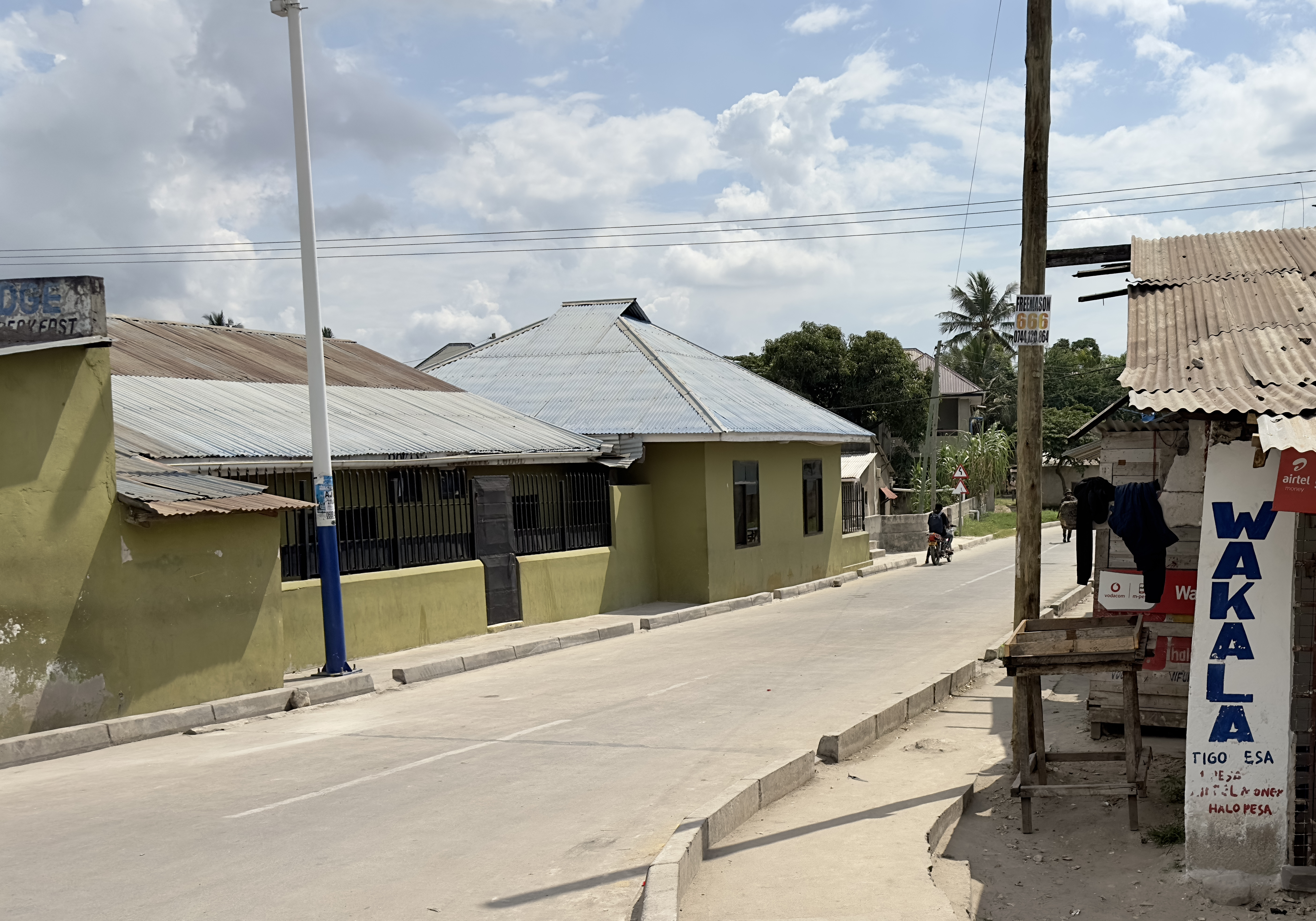
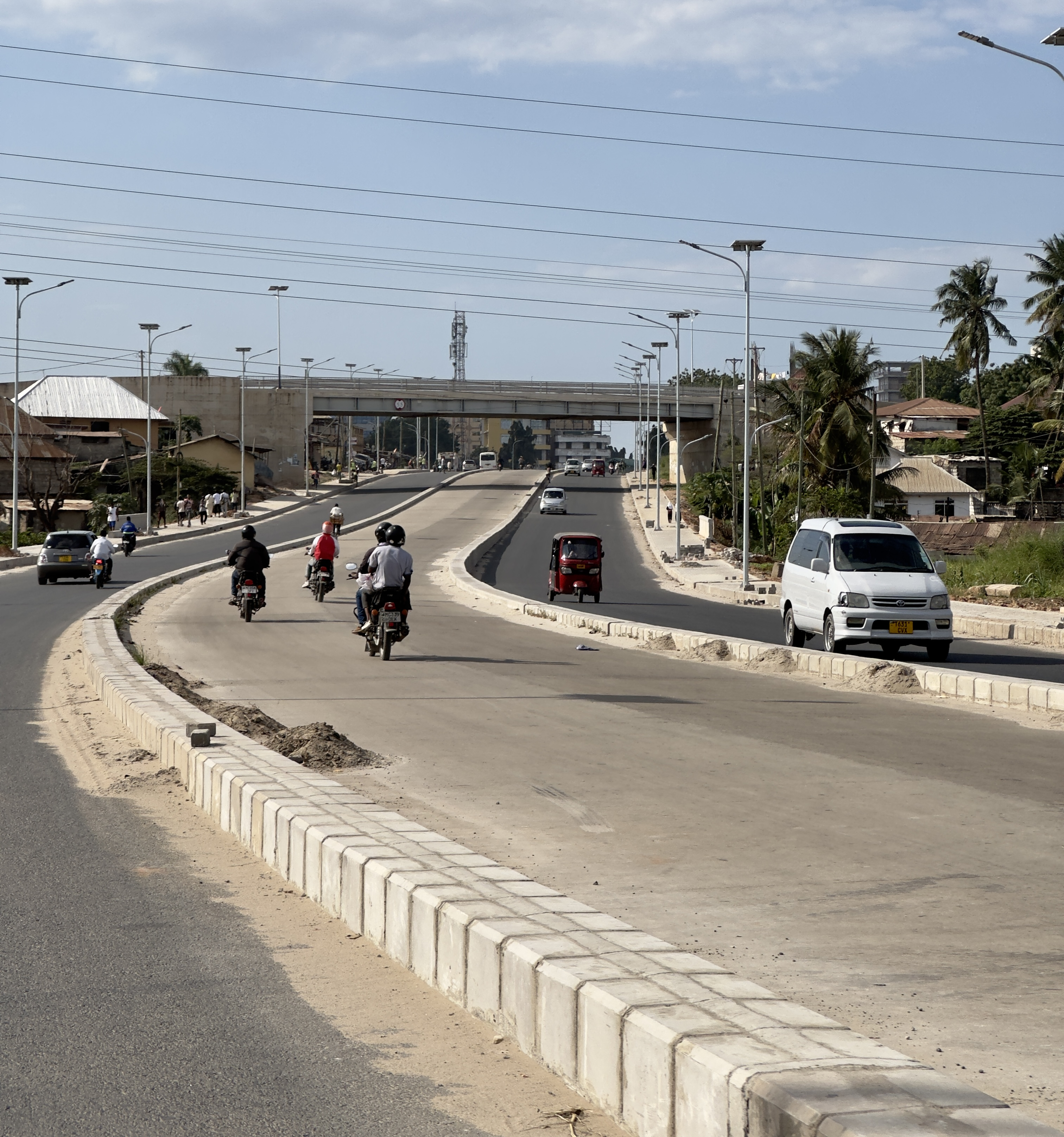
- From top to bottom: Bridge in Kigogo, Street in Kigogo, High Traffic area through Kigogo
- Interactive map of Kigogo
- Coordinates: 6°49′4.8″S 39°14′37.68″E
- Country: Tanzania
- Region: Dar es Salaam Region
- District: Kinondoni District

Area
  - Total: 1.9 km^{2} (0.73 sq mi)

Population (2012)
  - Total: 57,613

Ethnic groups
  - Settler: Swahili
  - Ancestral: Zaramo
- Tanzanian Postal Code: 14118

Kigogo (Kata ya Kigogo, in Swahili) is an administrative ward in Kinondoni District of the Dar es Salaam Region in Tanzania. Mburahati and Mabibo of Ubungo MC border the ward on the north and west, respectively. The ward is bordered to the east by the Mzimuni and Mchikichini of Ilala MC. The ward is bordered to the south by the wards of Ilala, Buguruni, and Tabata of Ilala MC. According to the 2012 census, the ward has a population of 57,613.

== Administration ==
The postal code for Kigogo ward is 14118. The ward is divided into the following neighborhoods (Mitaa):

- Kigogo Kati
- Kigogo Mbuyuni
- Kigogo Mkwajuni

=== Government ===
The ward, like every other ward in the country, has local government offices based on the population served. The Kigogo Ward administration building houses a court as per the Ward Tribunal Act of 1988, including other vital departments for the administration the ward. The ward has the following administration offices:

- Kigogo Police Station
- Kigogo Government Office (Afisa Mtendaji)
- Kigogo Tribunal (Baraza La Kata) is a Department inside Ward Government Office

In the local government system of Tanzania, the ward is the smallest democratic unit. Each ward is composed of a committee of eight elected council members which include a chairperson, one salaried officer (with no voting rights), and an executive officer. One-third of seats are reserved for women councillors.

== Demographics ==
The Zaramo people lived in the ward and a major portion of the district at one time. As the city progressed, the ward transformed into an international neighborhood. There are 57,613 people living in the ward.

== Education and health ==
=== Education ===
The ward is home to these educational institutions:

- Gonzaga Primary School
- Deepsea Primary School
- Mapinduzi Primary School, Kigogo
- Kigogo Secoundary School

=== Healthcare ===
The ward is home to the following health institutions:

- Kifaransa Dispensary
- Kigogo Eye Clinic
