= Makuburi =

Ward of Ubungo District, Dar es Salaam Region

Makuburi Kata ya Makuburi (Swahili)
- Ward of Ubungo District
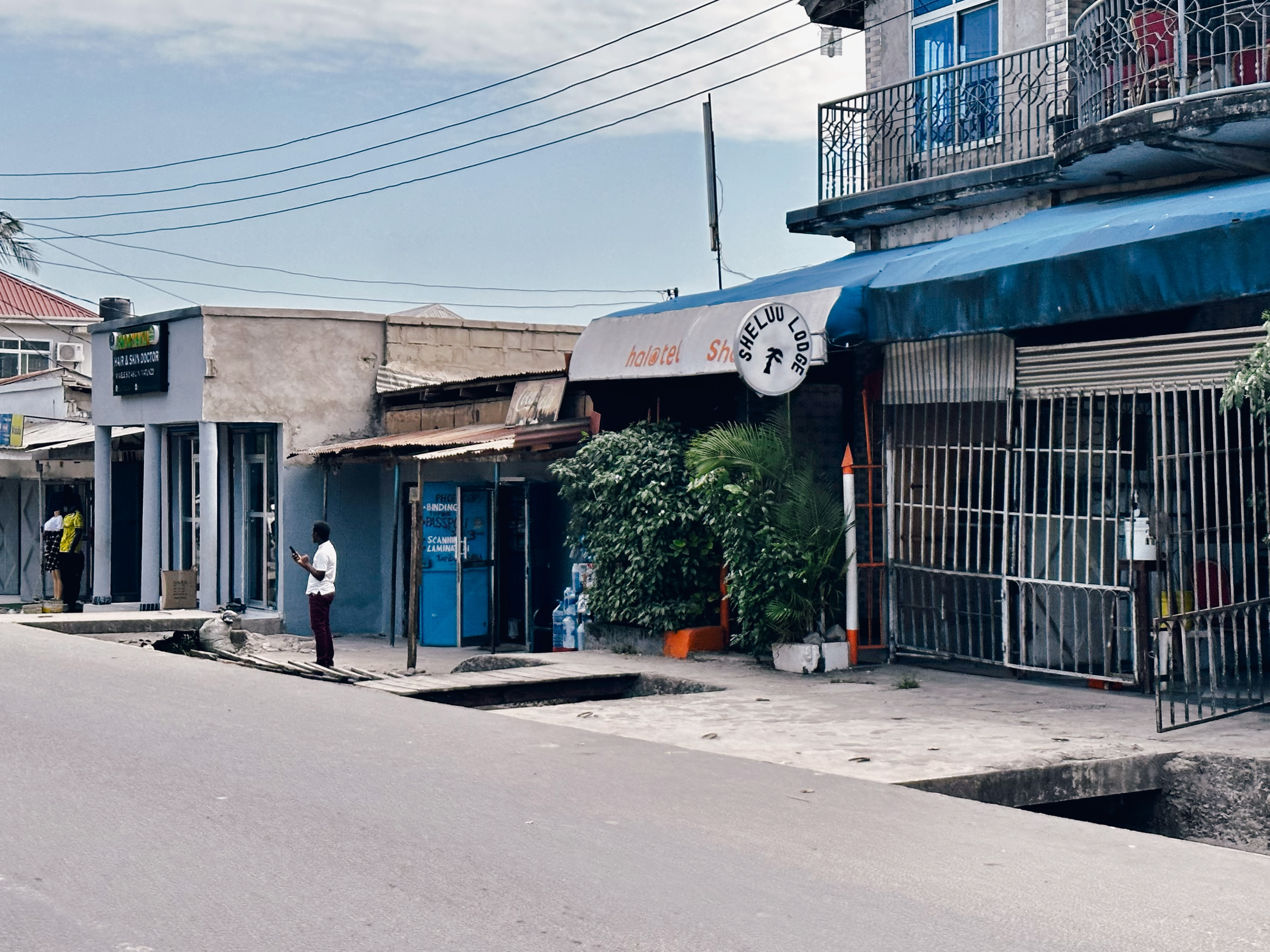
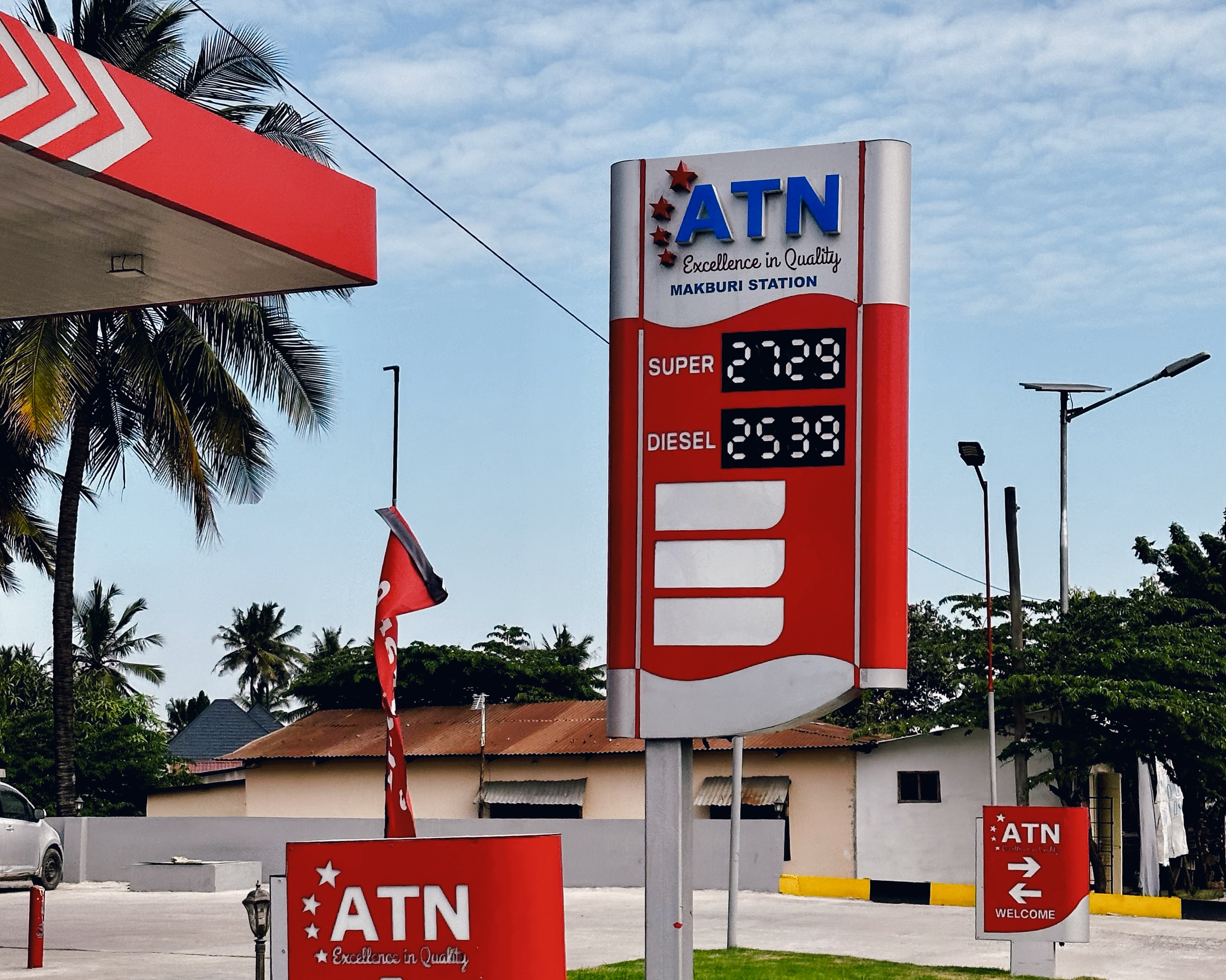
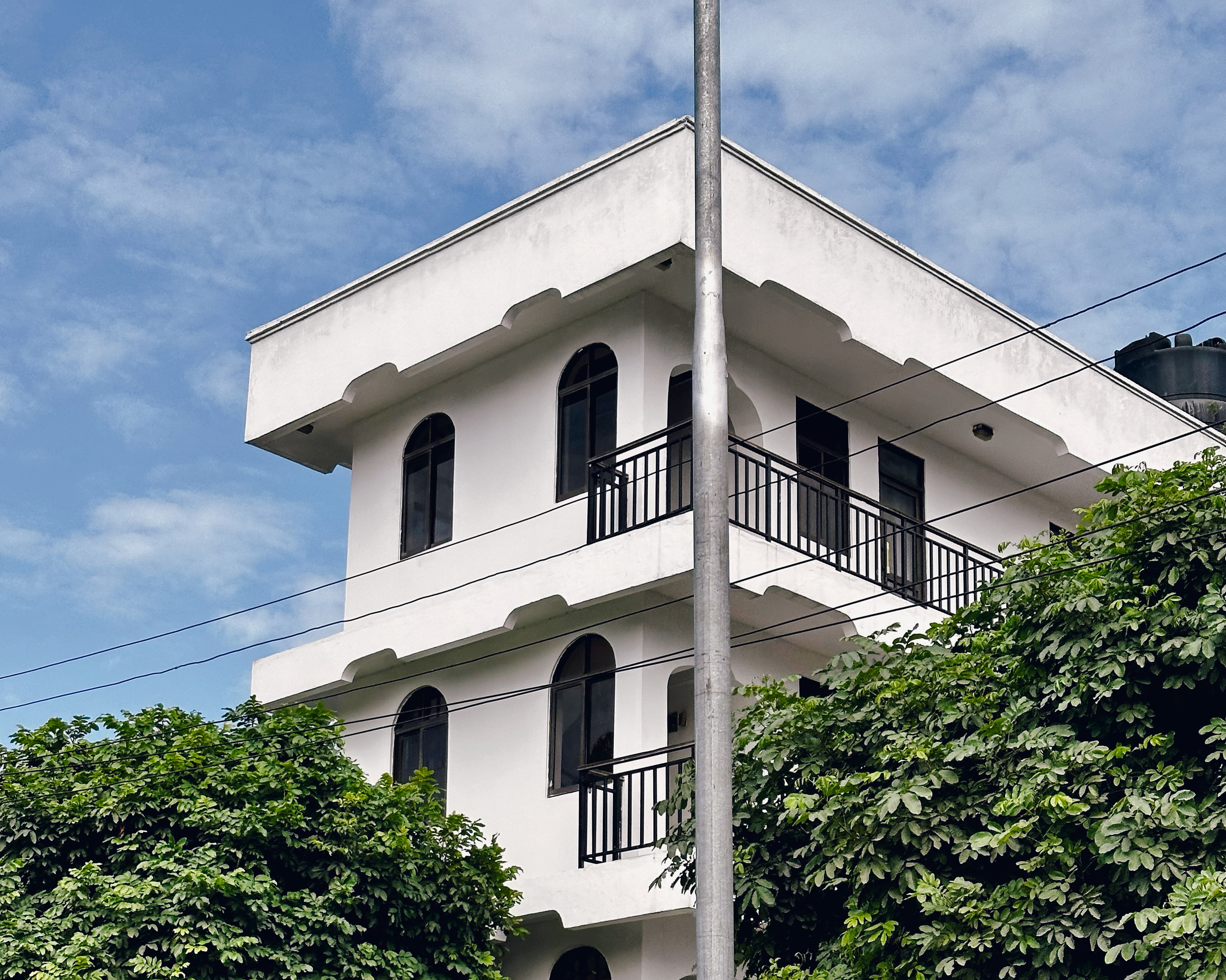
- From top to bottom: Street scene in Makuburi, Gas station in Makuburi & building in Makuburi
- Interactive map of Makuburi
- Coordinates: 6°48′22.32″S 39°12′7.56″E
- Country: Tanzania
- Region: Dar es Salaam Region
- District: Ubungo District

Area
  - Total: 7.6 km^{2} (2.9 sq mi)

Population (2012)
  - Total: 57,408

Ethnic groups
  - Settler: Swahili
  - Ancestral: Zaramo
- Tanzanian Postal Code: 16106

Makuburi (Kata ya Makuburi, in Swahili) is an administrative ward in Ubungo District of the Dar es Salaam Region in Tanzania. Ubungo borders the ward on its northern side. The ward is bordered by Mabibo to the east. Kimanga and Tabata of Ilala MC are to the south. Kimara ward is to the west. The ward is home to the Benjamin Mkapa Export Processing Zone and the largest Tanzanian Army Base in Ubungo District. The ward is also the headquarters of the Tanzania Medicine and Medical Devices Authority (TMDA). According to the 2012 census, the ward has a total population of 57,408.

== Administration ==
The postal code for Makuburi Ward is 16106. The ward is divided into the following neighborhoods (Mitaa):

- Kajima
- Kibangu
- Makoka

- Makuburi Kibangu
- Mwongozo

=== Government ===
Like every other ward in the country, the ward has local government offices based on the population served. The Makuburi Ward administration building houses a court as per the Ward Tribunal Act of 1988, including other vital departments for the administration of the ward. The ward has the following administration offices:

- Makuburi Ward Police Station
- Makuburi Ward Government Office (Afisa Mtendaji)
- Makuburi Ward Tribunal (Baraza La Kata) is a Department inside Ward Government Office

In the local government system of Tanzania, the ward is the smallest democratic unit. Each ward comprises a committee of eight elected council members, including a chairperson, one salaried officer (with no voting rights), and an executive officer. One-third of seats are reserved for women councilors.

== Demographics ==
The ward serves as the Zaramo's ancestral home along with a sizable chunk of the district. The ward changed over time into a cosmopolitan ward as the city grew.

== Education and health ==
=== Education ===
The ward is home to these educational institutions:

- Makuburi Primary School
- Makoka Primary School
- Makoka Secondary School
- Makuburi Mpakani Primary School
- Ubungo Islamic Secondary School of Makuburi
- Yusuf R. Makamba Secondary School
- Makoka Secondary School

=== Healthcare ===
The ward is home to the following health institutions:

- Mabibo Health Center of Makuburi
- Maruku Modern Health Center
- JWTZ Ubungo Hospital of Makurumla
- Omek Family Health Center
- Oasis Health center
