= Tabata, Ilala =

Ward of Ilala District, Dar es Salaam Region

Tabata Kata ya Tabata (Swahili)
- Ward of Ilala District
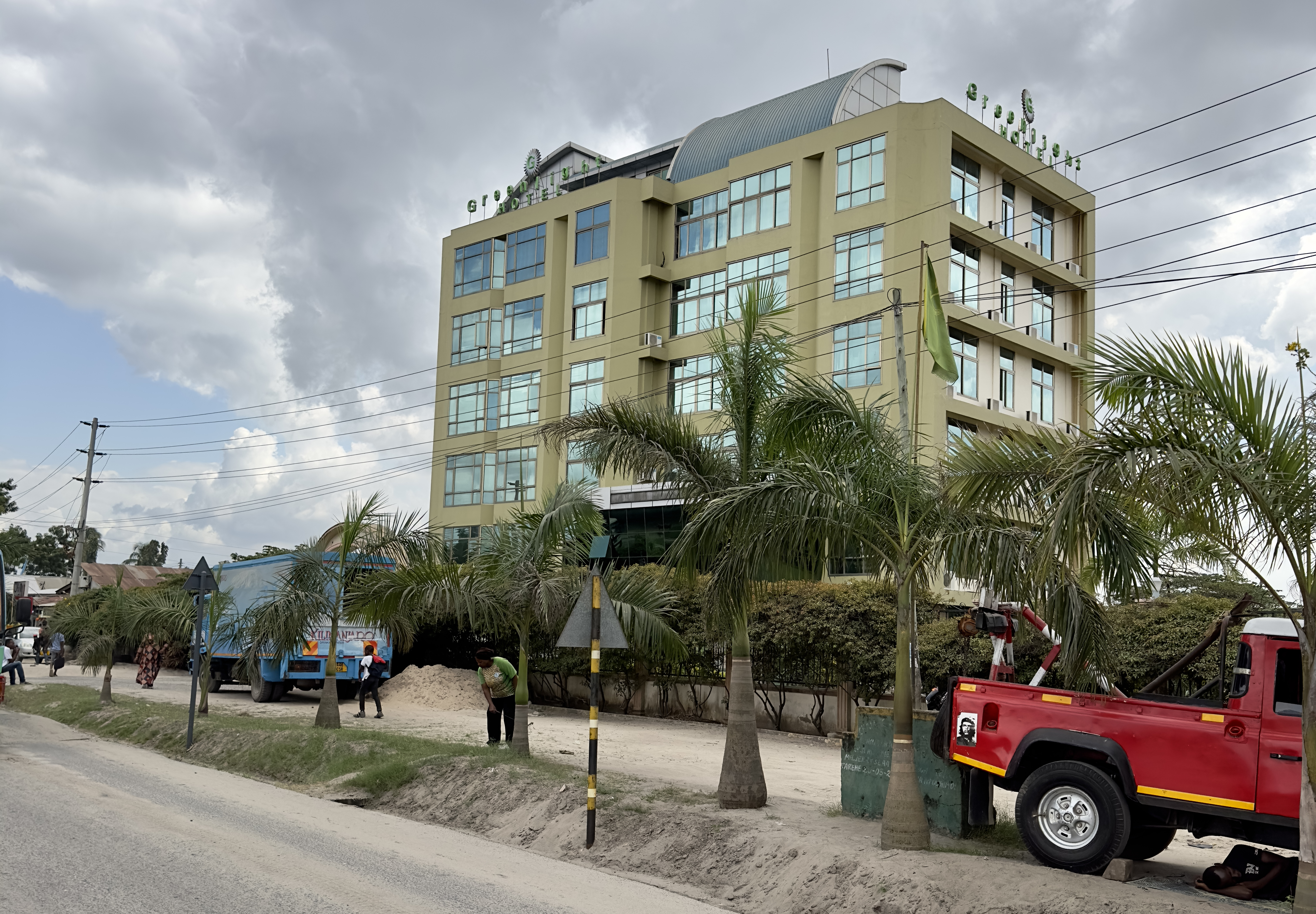
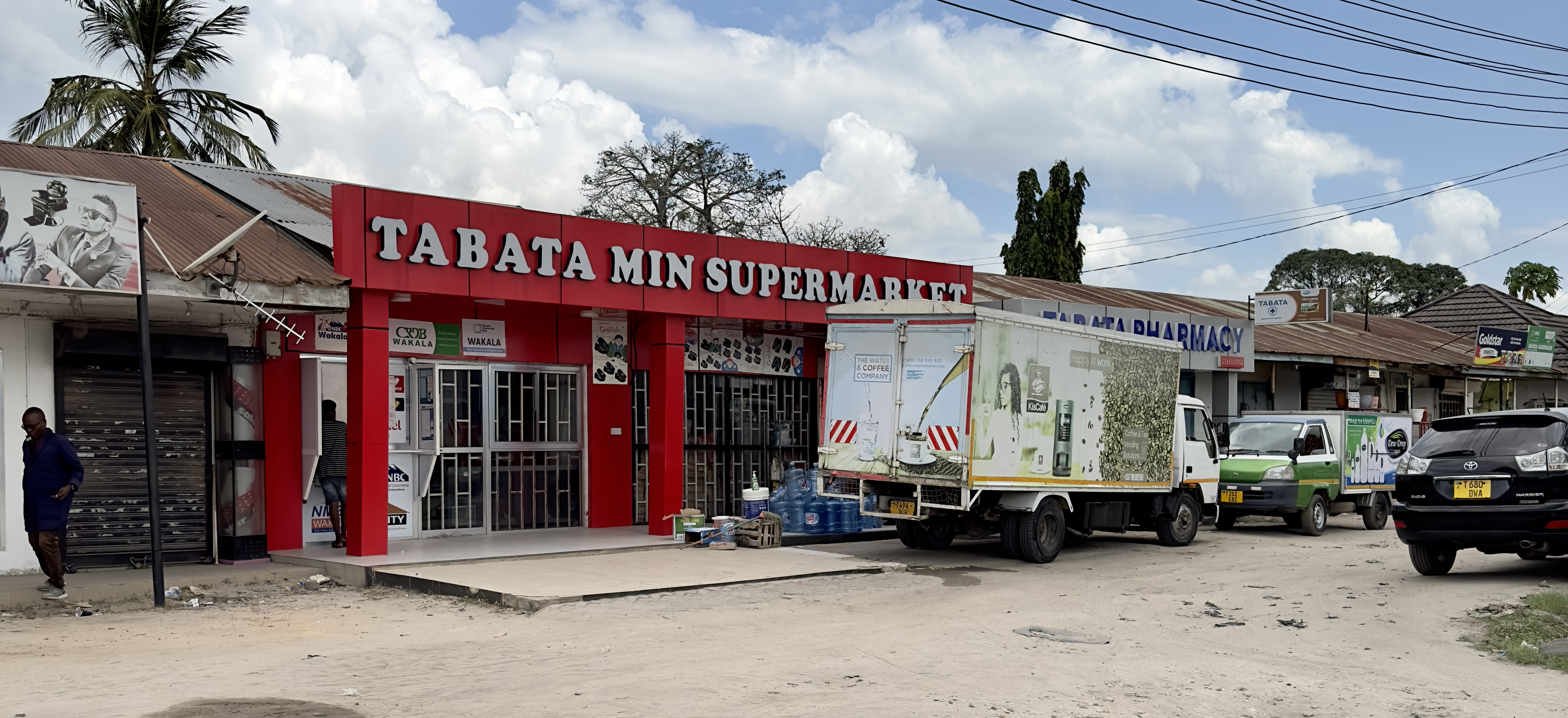
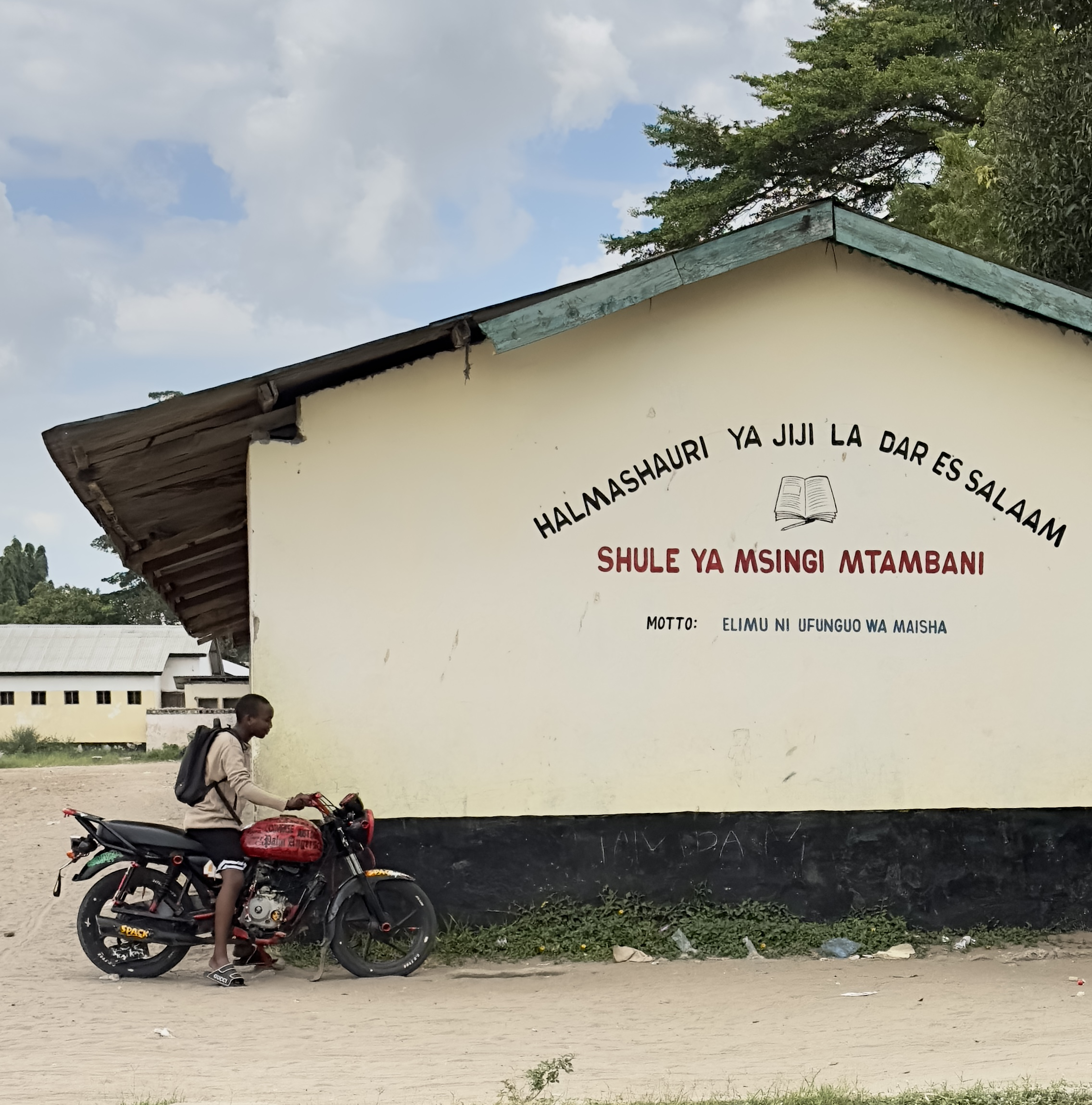
- From top to bottom: Scene in tabata, Shops in tabata, Mtambani Primary School in Tabata
- Interactive map of Tabata
- Coordinates: 6°49′51.24″S 39°13′15.24″E
- Country: Tanzania
- Region: Dar es Salaam Region
- District: Ilala District

Area
  - Total: 4.4 km^{2} (1.7 sq mi)

Population (2012)
  - Total: 74,742

Ethnic groups
  - Settler: Swahili
  - Ancestral: Zaramo
- Tanzanian Postal Code: 12103

Tabata (Kata ya Tabata, in Swahili) is an administrative ward of the Ilala Municipical Council of the Dar es Salaam Region in Tanzania. The ward is bordered to the north by the Ubungo MC wards of Makuburi and Mabibo. Kigogo of Kinondoni MC form the eastern boundary of the ward. Vingunguti and Buguruni are to the south. lastly, the Segerea and Kimanga wards in the west. According to the 2012 census, the ward has a total population of 74,742.

== Administration ==
The postal code for the Tabata ward is 12103. The ward is divided into the following neighborhoods (Mitaa):

- Kisiwani
- Mandela
- Matumbi
- Msimbazi

- Msimbazi Magharibi
- Tabata
- Tege

=== Government ===
The ward, like every other ward in the country, has local government offices based on the population served.The Tabata Ward administration building houses a court as per the Ward Tribunal Act of 1988, including other vital departments for the administration the ward. The ward has the following administration offices:

- Tabata Police Station
- Tabata Government Office (Afisa Mtendaji)
- Tabata Ward Tribunal (Baraza La Kata) is a Department inside Ward Government Office

In the local government system of Tanzania, the ward is the smallest democratic unit. Each ward is composed of a committee of eight elected council members which include a chairperson, one salaried officer (with no voting rights), and an executive officer. One-third of seats are reserved for women councillors.

== Projects ==
Tabata was mapped by the Ramani Huria project in October–November 2015 and data is available on OpenStreetMap.

== Demographics ==
The ward serves as the Zaramo people's ancestral home, along with much of the district. As the city developed throughout time, the ward became into a cosmopolitan ward. In total, 106,946 people called the ward home in 2012.

== Education and health ==
=== Education ===
The ward is home to these educational institutions

- Tabata JICA Primary School
- Mtambani Primary School
- Kenton Secondary School
- African School of Tabata
- St. Mary's International School of Tabata

=== Healthcare ===
The ward is home to the following health institutions:

- Prince Saud Health Center
- Tabata Kisiwani Health Center
- Esperance Physiptherapy Clinic of Tabata
- Tabata Dispensary
- Tabata Relini Health Center
- MICO Tabata Health Center
