= Hatef Sadeghi =

Iranian–British physicist and professor of quantum engineering

- Citizenship: Iranian-British
- Education: PhD
- Alma mater: Lancaster University (PhD)
- Awards: Leverhulme Early Career Fellowship (2017); UKRI Future Leaders Fellowship (2019, 2023)
- Scientific career
- Fields: Quantum engineering; Nanoelectronics; Molecular electronics
- Workplaces: University of Warwick; Lancaster University

Hatef Sadeghi is Professor of Quantum Engineering, UKRI Future Leaders Fellow (UKRI FLF) and Head of Device Modelling Group in the School of Engineering at the University of Warwick. He is known for his work in theory of molecular electronics and quantum, phonon and spin interference for quantum energy conversion.

== Education ==
Sadeghi earned his PhD in Physics (Nanoelectronics) from Lancaster University, where he received the best student award in 2015.

== Career and research ==
He obtained his PhD in Physics - Nanoelectronics from Lancaster University in 2016 and appointed as a Senior Research Associate at Lancaster University. He then was awarded a Leverhulme Early Career Fellowship in 2017 and a UKRI Future Leaders Fellowship in 2019 and in 2023 to exploit quantum and phonon interference in molecular-scale thermoelectric materials for energy harvesting and biosensing. He joined the School of Engineering at the University of Warwick in September 2019 as an assistant professor, was promoted to associate professor in 2021, and to Full Professor and Chair of Quantum Engineering and Device Modelling in 2023.

His main research area is the theory of quantum engineering of advanced quantum materials and devices, and he has played a foundational role in the development of innovative strategies for demonstrating, controlling, and exploiting quantum, spin, and phonon interference for applications in quantum energy conversion, quantum sensing, and quantum computing.

He develops fundamental ideas and theories, and is proactive in designing experiments for their implementation in the laboratory. He currently collaborates with several internationally recognised experimental groups and industries in the UK, EU, USA, and Asia. He has published more than 150 peer-reviewed papers, some of which are in top journals such as Nature, Nature Materials, Nature Nanotechnology, Nature Electronics, Nano Letters, PNAS, Journal of the American Chemical Society, Nature Communications, ACS Nano, Advanced Functional Materials, Science Advances, and Angewandte Chemie.

== Selected publications ==
- Sibug-Torres, SM; Niihori, M.; Wyatt, E.; Arul, R.; Spiesshofer, N.; Jones, T.; Graham, D.; de Nijs, B.; Scherman, O. A.; Rao, R. R.; Ryan, M. P.; Squires, A.; Savory, C. N.; Scanlon, D. O.; Daaoub, A. H. S.; Sangtarash, S.; Sadeghi, Hatef; Baumberg, J. J. (2025). "Transient Au–Cl adlayers modulate the surface chemistry of gold nanoparticles during redox reactions". Nature Chemistry. doi:10.1038/s41557-025-01989-4. PMC 12872461.
- Zheng, L.; Farahani, E. N.; Daaoub, A. H. S.; Sangtarash, S.; Sadeghi, Hatef (2025). "Rules of connectivity-dependent phonon interference in molecular junctions". Nano Letters. 25 (16): 6524–6529. doi:10.1021/acs.nanolett.5c00225. PMC 12023023.
- Bar-David, J.; Daaoub, A.; Chen, S.; Sibug-Torres, S. M.; Rocchetti, S.; Kang, G.; Davidson, R. J.; Salthouse, R. J.; Guo, C.; Mueller, N. S.; Sangtarash, S.; Bryce, M. R.; Sadeghi, Hatef; Baumberg, J. J. (2025). "Electronically perturbed vibrational excitations of the luminescing stable Blatter radical". ACS Nano. 19 (18): 7650–7660. doi:10.1021/acsnano.4c09661. PMC 11887450.
- Sil, A.; Hamilton, L.; Morris, J. M. F.; Daaoub, A. H. S.; Burrows, J. H. H.; Robertson, C. M.; Luzyanin, K.; Higgins, S. J.; Sadeghi, Hatef; Nichols, R. J.; Sangtarash, S.; Vezzoli, A. (2024). "Zero-bias anti-ohmic behaviour in diradicaloid molecular wires". Angewandte Chemie International Edition. doi:10.1002/anie.202410304.
- Qiao, A. X.; Sil, A.; Sangtarash, S.; Smith, S.; Wu, C.; Robertson, C. M.; Nichols, R. J.; Higgins, S. J.; Sadeghi, Hatef; Vezzoli, A. (2024). "Nuclear magnetic resonance chemical shift as a probe for single-molecule charge transport". Angewandte Chemie International Edition. doi:10.1002/anie.202402413.
- He, P.; Daaoub, A.; Sangtarash, S.; Sadeghi, Hatef; Yoon, H. J. (2024). "Thermopower in underpotential deposition based molecular junctions". Nano Letters. doi:10.1021/acs.nanolett.3c04438.
- Chelli, Y.; Sandhu, S.; Daaoub, A. H. S.; Sangtarash, S.; Sadeghi, Hatef (2023). "Controlling spin interference in single radical molecules". Nano Letters. 23 (9): 3748–3753. doi:10.1021/acs.nanolett.2c05068.
- Gao, T.; Daaoub, A.; Pan, Z.; Hu, Y.; Yuan, S.; Li, Y.; Dong, G.; Huang, R.; Liu, J.; Sangtarash, S.; Sadeghi, Hatef; Hong, W. (2023). "Supramolecular radical electronics". Journal of the American Chemical Society. 145 (31): 17232–17241. doi:10.1021/jacs.3c04323.
- Chavez-Angel, E.; Tsipas, P.; Xiao, P.; Ahmadi, M.; Daaoub, A.; Sadeghi, Hatef; Sotomayor Torres, C.; Dimoulas, A.; El Sachat, A. (2023). "Engineering heat transport across epitaxial lattice-mismatched van der Waals heterointerfaces". Nano Letters. 23 (15): 6883–6891. arXiv:2303.05808. doi:10.1021/acs.nanolett.3c01280. hdl:10261/346762.
- Xu, Xiaohong; Wang, Jing; Blankevoort, N.; Daaoub, A.; Sangtarash, S.; Shi, Jiawei; Fang, Chunhui; Yuan, Siyuan; Chen, L.; Liu, J.; Yang, Y.; Sadeghi, Hatef; Hong, Weihua (2022). "Scaling of quantum interference from single molecules to molecular cages and their monolayers". Proceedings of the National Academy of Sciences. 119 (46) e2211786119. doi:10.1073/pnas.2211786119. PMC 9674264.
- Sadeghi, Hatef (2019). "Quantum and phonon interference enhanced molecular-scale thermoelectricity". The Journal of Physical Chemistry C. 123 (20): 12556–12562. doi:10.1021/acs.jpcc.8b12538. PMC 7011773.
- Sadeghi, Hatef; Lambert, C. J. (2018). "Interference effects in charge transport through molecular junctions". Accounts of Chemical Research. 51 (9): 2158–2168. doi:10.1021/acs.accounts.8b00429.
- Mol, J. A.; Lau, C. S.; Lewis, W. J. M.; Sadeghi, H.; Roche, C.; Cnossen, A.; Warner, J. H.; Lambert, C. J.; Anderson, H. L.; Briggs, G. A. D. (2015). "Graphene–porphyrin single-molecule transistors". Nanoscale. 7 (31): 13181–13185. doi:10.1039/C5NR03294F.

== See also ==
- UK Research and Innovation
- Vanessa Sancho‑Shimizu
- Fay Bound Alberti
- Clement Sefa-Nyarko
- Jennifer Garden
- Noemi Procopio
