= Belvedere, Montevideo =

Belvedere
- Barrio
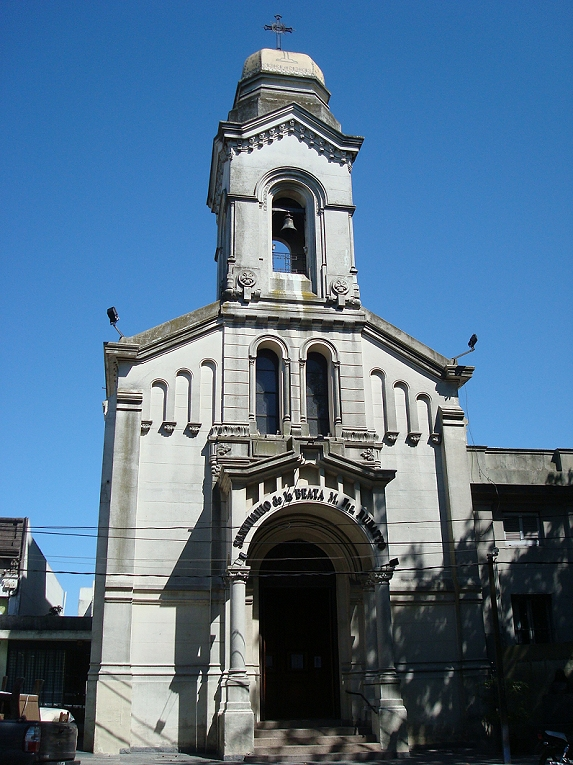
- Sanctuary of the Blessed Francesca Maria Rubatto

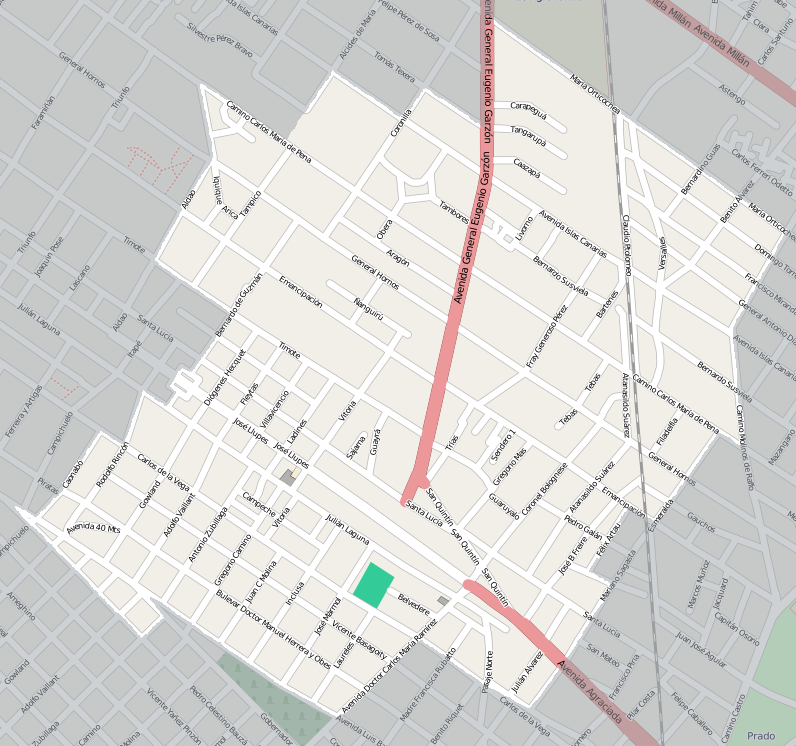
- Street map of Belvedere

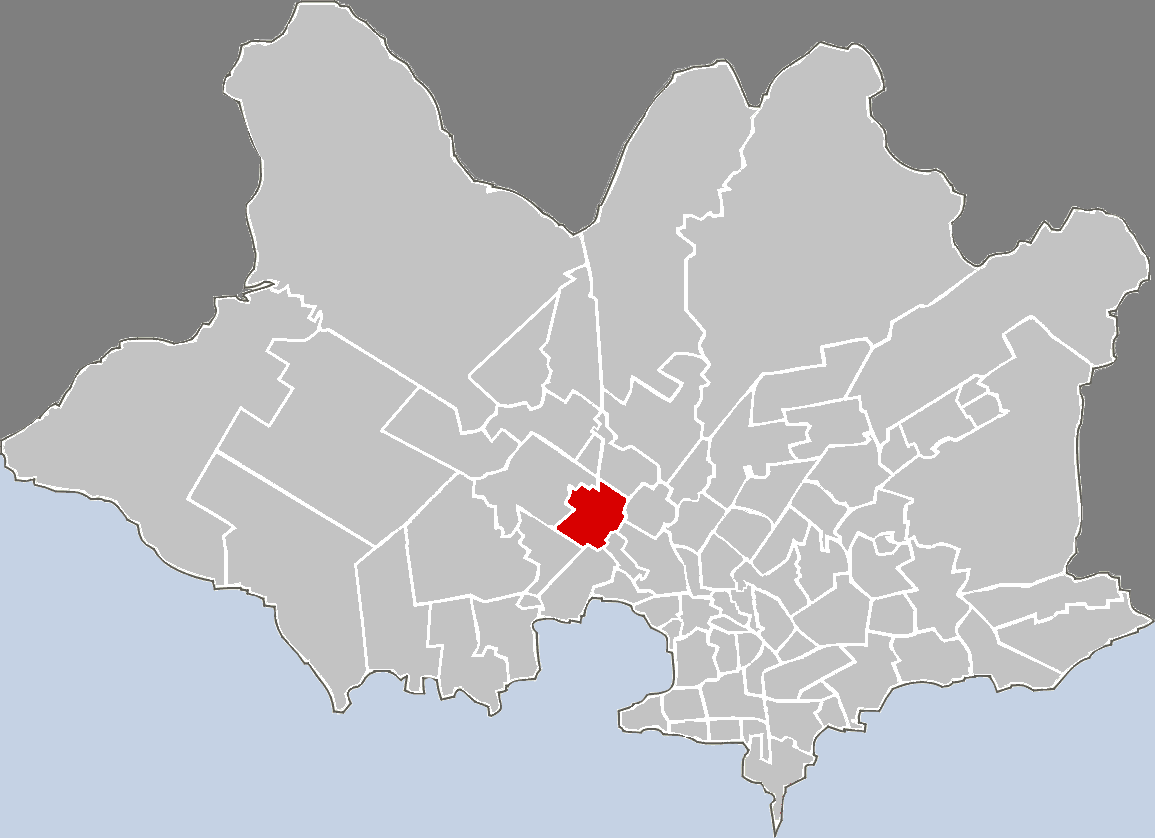
- Location of Belvedere in Montevideo
- Coordinates: 34°51′6″S 56°12′58″W
- Country: Uruguay
- Department: Montevideo Department
- City: Montevideo

Belvedere is a barrio (neighbourhood or district) of Montevideo, Uruguay. An area known as Paso Molino, which starts in the Prado and extends into Belvedere, is a frequented shopping venue.

== Location ==
Belvedere borders Nuevo París to the northwest, Sayago to the northeast, Paso de las Duranas to the east, Prado to the southeast, La Teja and Tres Ombúes to the south.

== Educational facilities ==
- Colegio y Liceo San Francisco de Asís(private, Roman Catholic, Friars Minor Capuchin)

== Places of worship ==
- Church of St Francis of Assisi (Roman Catholic, Friars Minor Capuchin)
- Sanctuary Chapel of the Blessed Francesca Rubatto (Roman Catholic, Capuchin Sisters of Mother Rubatto)

== See also ==
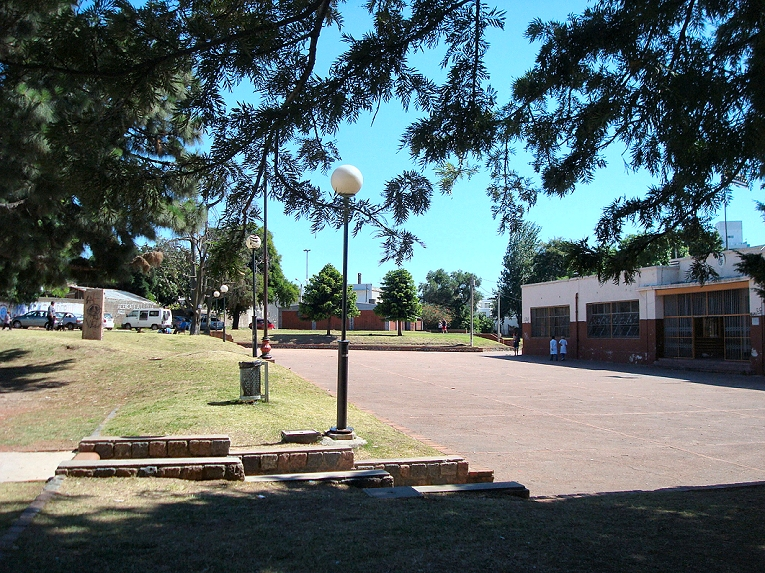
Parque Bellán in Belvedere

- Barrios of Montevideo
