= Carmagnola =

Carmagnola Carmagnòla (Piedmontese)
- Comune
- Città di Carmagnola
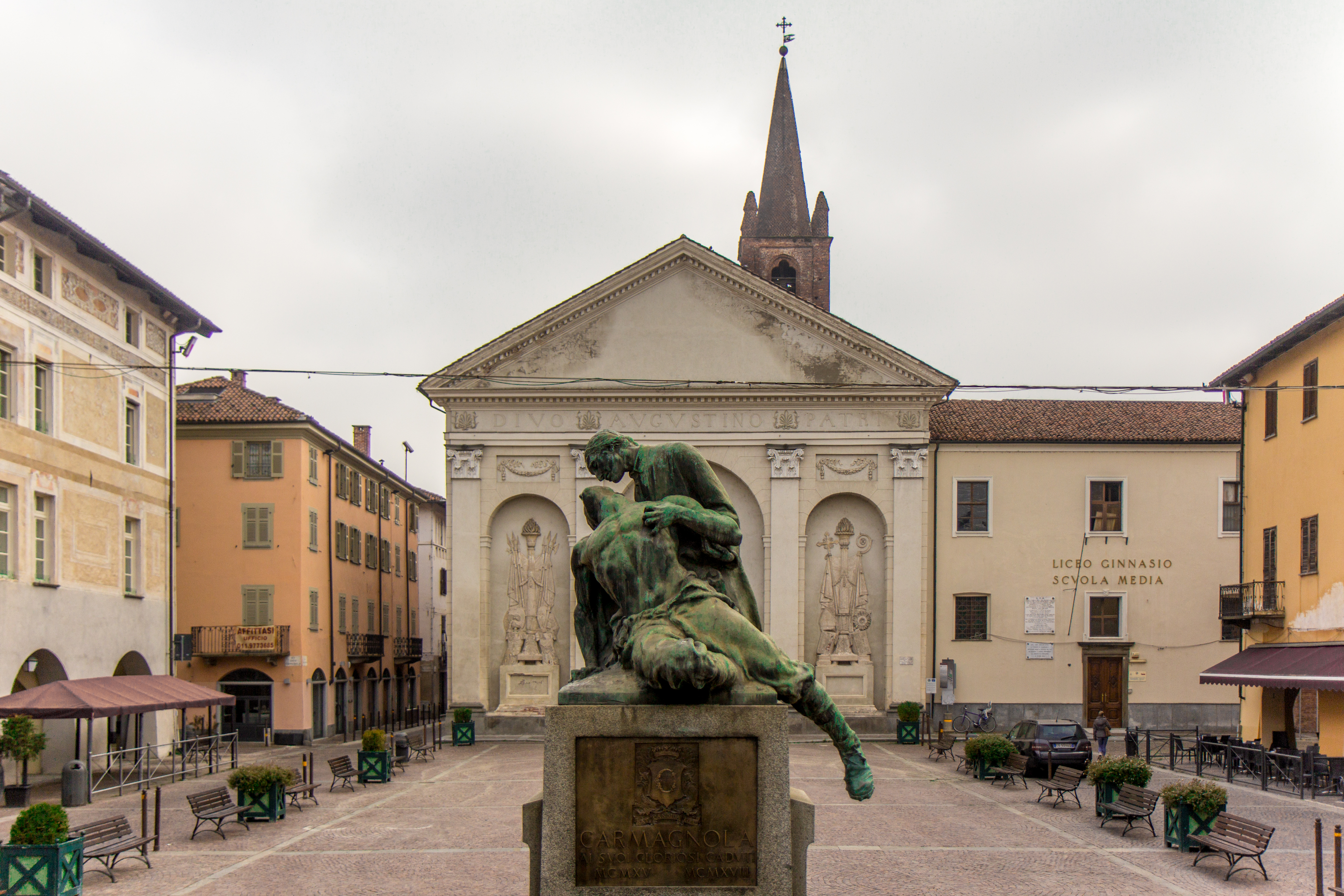
- Piazza Sant'Agostino, old town. War memorial and Sant'Agostino church in the background

- Coat of arms
- Motto: Dat candida coelo (Latin for "He gives white light to the heavens")
- Location within Italy Location within Piedmont
- Coordinates: 44°51′N 7°43′E
- Country: Italy
- Region: Piedmont
- Metropolitan city: Turin (TO)
- Frazioni: Bossola, Cappuccini, Casanova, Cascine Madama, Cavalleri, Cavalleri Piccoli, Chiaberti, Cocchi, Corno, Due Provincie, Fumeri, Gaidi, Molinasso, Morello, Motta, Oselle, Pochettino, Salsasio, San Bernardo, San Giovanni, San Grato, San Michele, Tetti Grandi, Tuninetti, Vallongo

Government
  - Mayor: Ivana Gaveglio

Area
  - Total: 95.71 km^{2} (36.95 sq mi)
- Elevation: 240 m (790 ft)

Population (1-1-2025)
  - Total: 28,080
  - Density: 293.4/km^{2} (759.9/sq mi)
- Demonym(s): Carmagnolese, pl Carmagnolesi
- Time zone: UTC+1 (CET)
  - Summer (DST): UTC+2 (CEST)
- Postal code: 10022
- Dialing code: +39 011
- Patron saint: Immaculate Conception
- Saint day: 8 December
- Website: Official website

Carmagnola (Italian: [karmaɲˈɲɔːla]; Piedmontese: Carmagnòla [karmaˈɲɔla]) is a comune (municipality) in the Metropolitan City of Turin in the Italian region Piedmont, located 29 kilometres (18 mi) south of Turin. The town is on the right side of the Po river. The nature of the soil determined over time how the river's sand accumulated.

Carmagnola borders the following municipalities: Poirino, Villastellone, Carignano, Lombriasco, Ceresole d'Alba, Racconigi, Sommariva del Bosco, Caramagna Piemonte.

== Toponymy ==
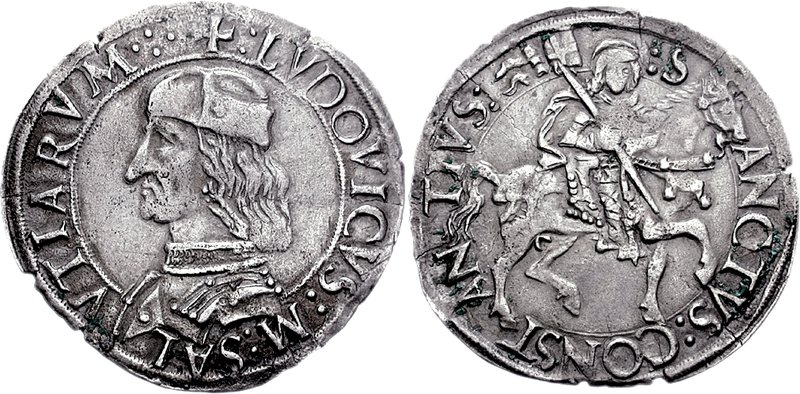
A cavallotto coin from the mint of Carmagnola depicting Ludovico II, Marquess of Saluzzo (1475)

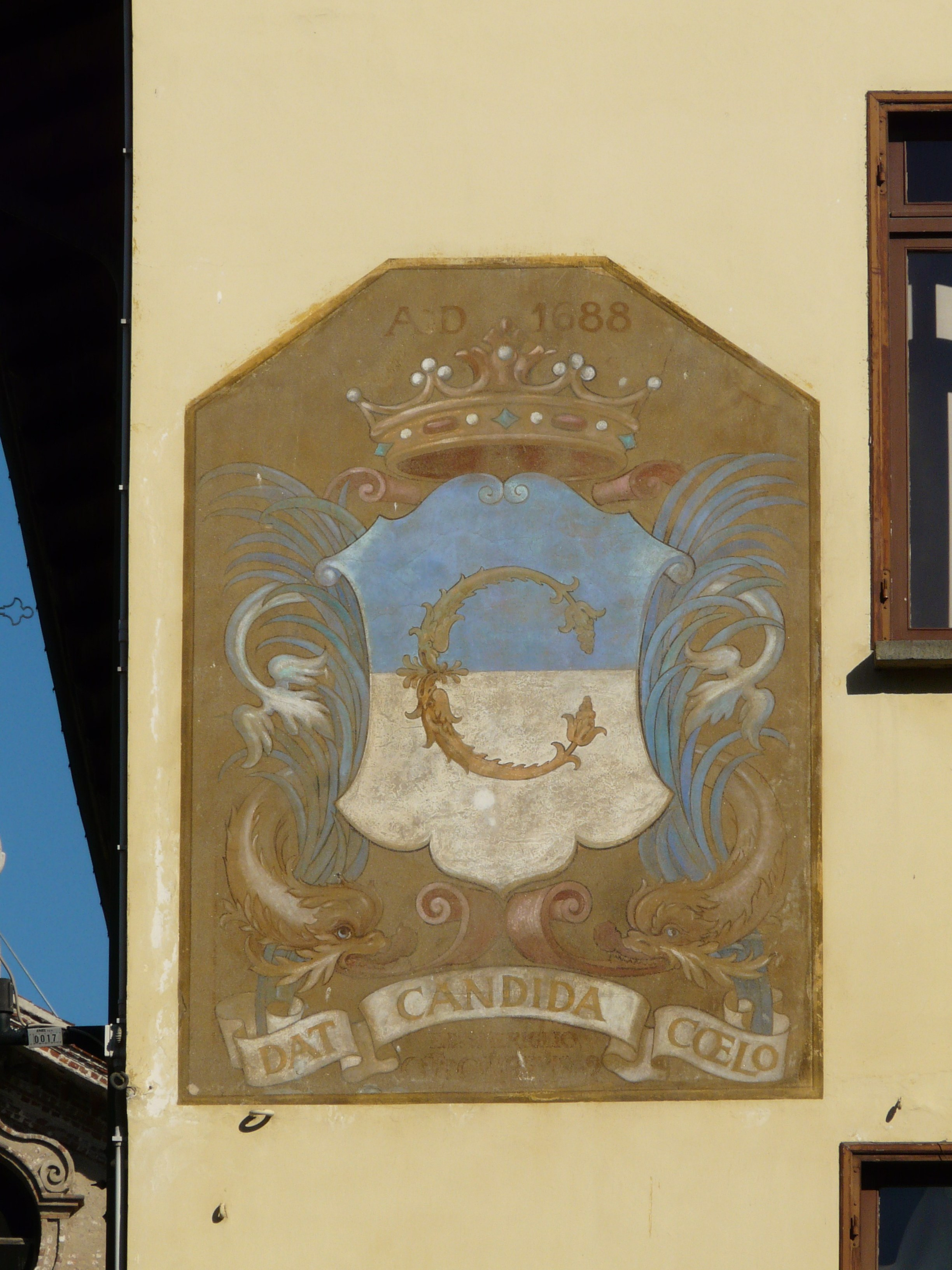
Coat of arms on a palace façade

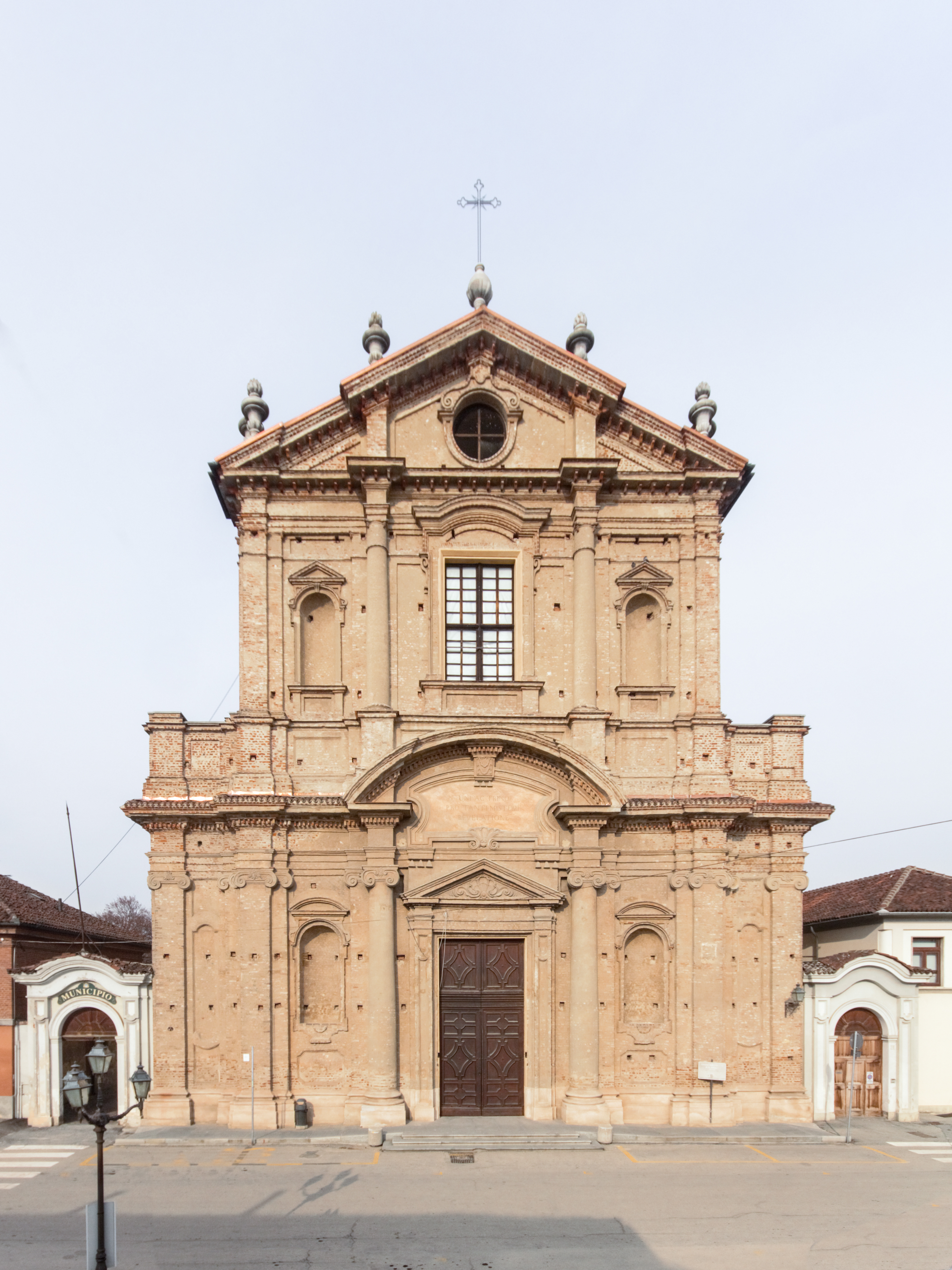
San Filippo church

The toponymy of the city of Carmagnola probably derives from the Latin "(centuria) magniola", in reference to a square, modestly-sized plot of land. However, some scholars argue that the toponym may derive from the Roman noble name Carminius.

== History ==
The municipality is mentioned for the first time during the 11th century. The land, originally owned by the Arduinic dynasty, passed to the Marquisate of Saluzzo, who had a castle built here. The Saluzzo dynasty soon underwent a rapid decadence ending with a French domination period which lasted 40 years. In 1588 Carmagnola became a possession of the House of Savoy, when Charles Emmanuel I besieged and conquered it. France took possession of Carmagnola a second time during the 17th century, during the civil war between Madamisti and Principisti (supporters of the French and the Savoy dynasty respectively). In this period (1637–1642), the three main subdivisions were razed to the ground as they were conflicting with the defence structures, and immediately re-built around 1.5 km from their original position, where they still are at the present time.

In 1690 the town was once again occupied by the French general Catinat, but just one year later Victor Amadeus II of Savoy brought it back among Piedmontese possessions. While its defence buildings were being demolished and its strategic role was progressively decreasing in importance, the town could finally develop agriculture and commerce, mainly of hemp and ropes, which were exported in great quantity to Liguria and southern France. The characteristic of both agricultural and commercial site remained important until after World War II, which caused a massive immigration and a rapid urbanistic expansion.

The name of La Carmagnole, the title of a French song and dance made popular during the French Revolution, is considered to be indirectly derived from the Italian town - i.e., the customary costume of the Piedmontese peasants living near and around Carmagnola was named for the town; when some of these peasants came to Paris, their dress influenced the popular short jacket worn by working-class militant sans-culottes, who sang the song.

== Main sights ==
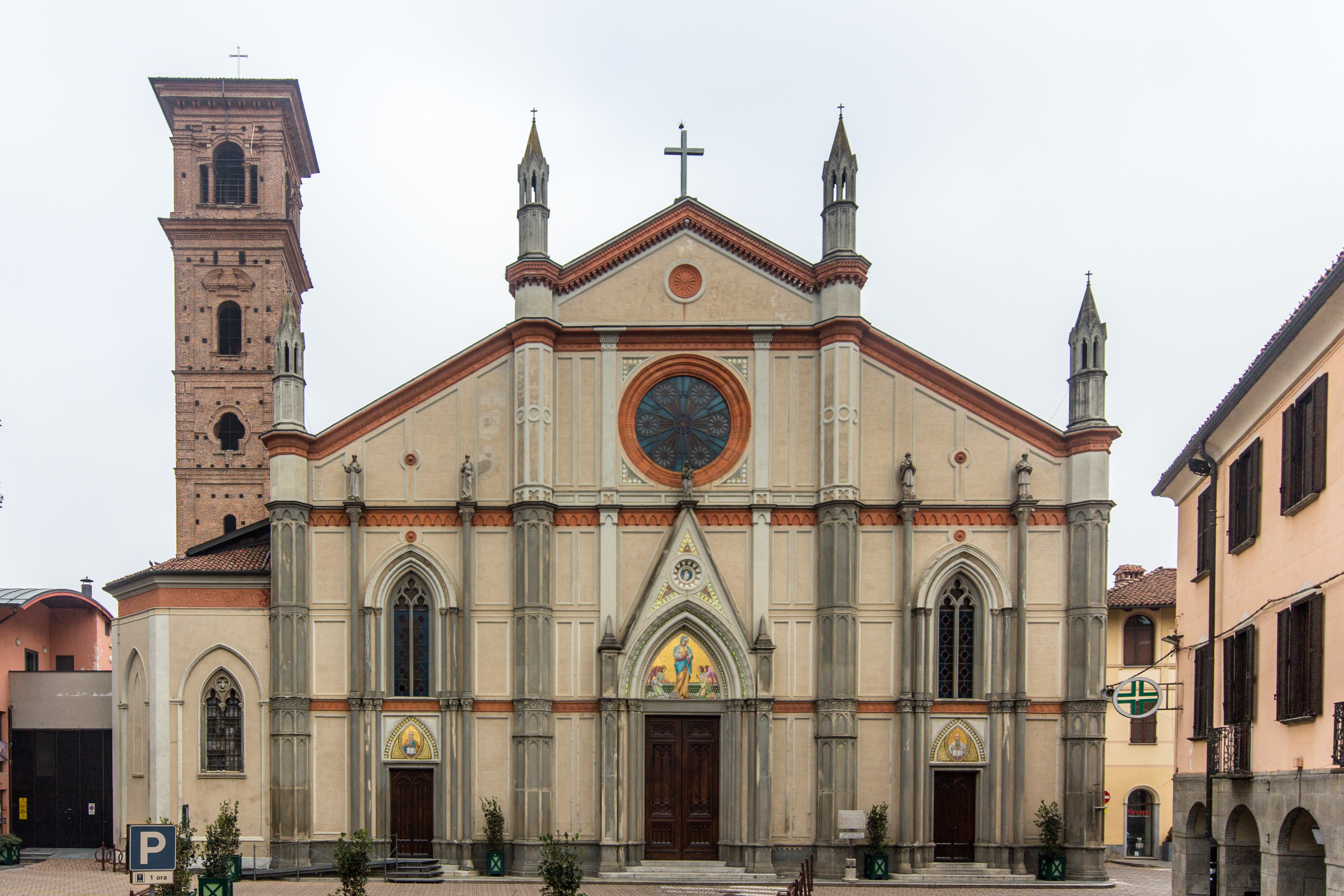
Collegiate church of Sts. Peter and Paul

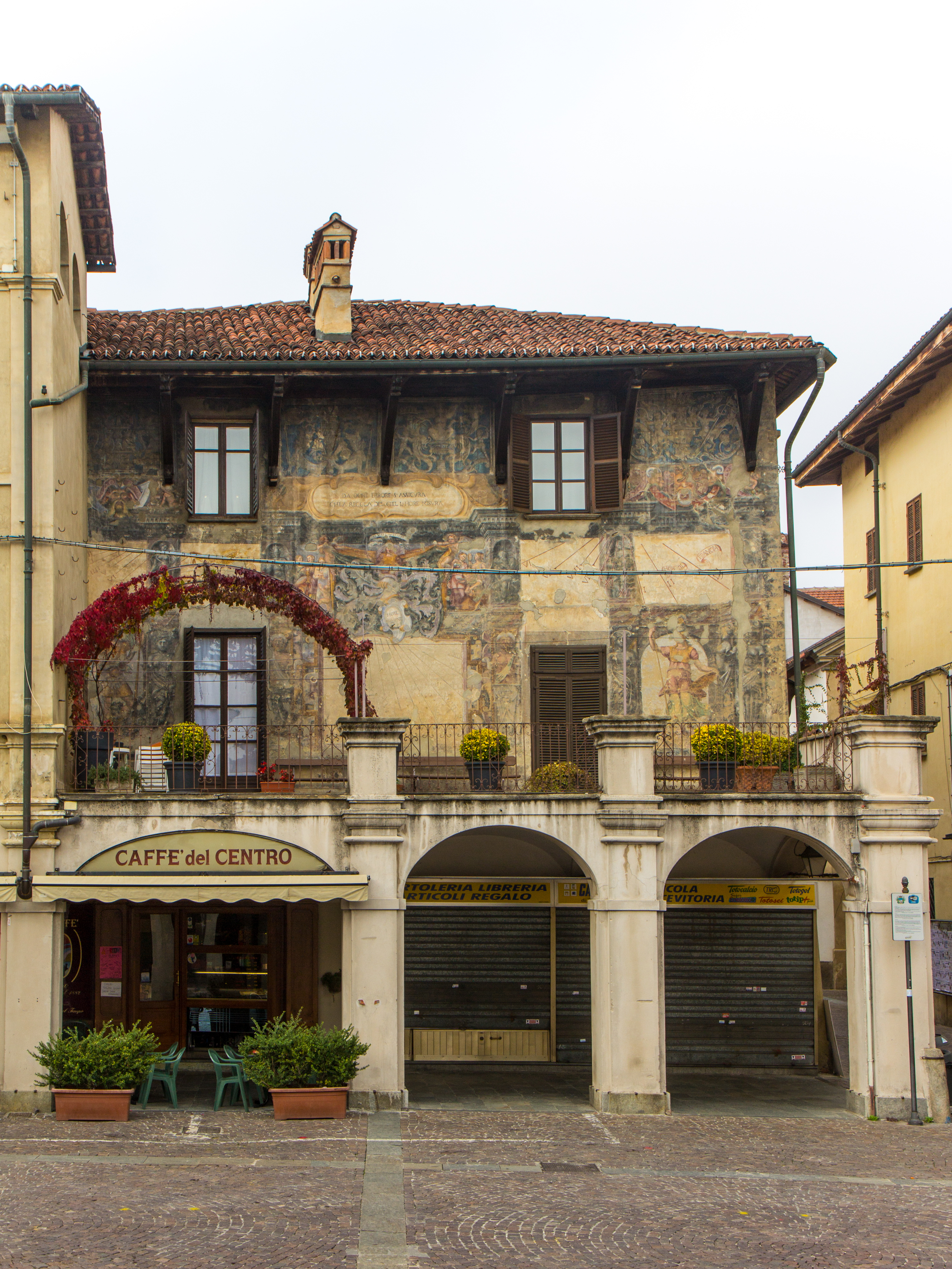
House of the Sundials

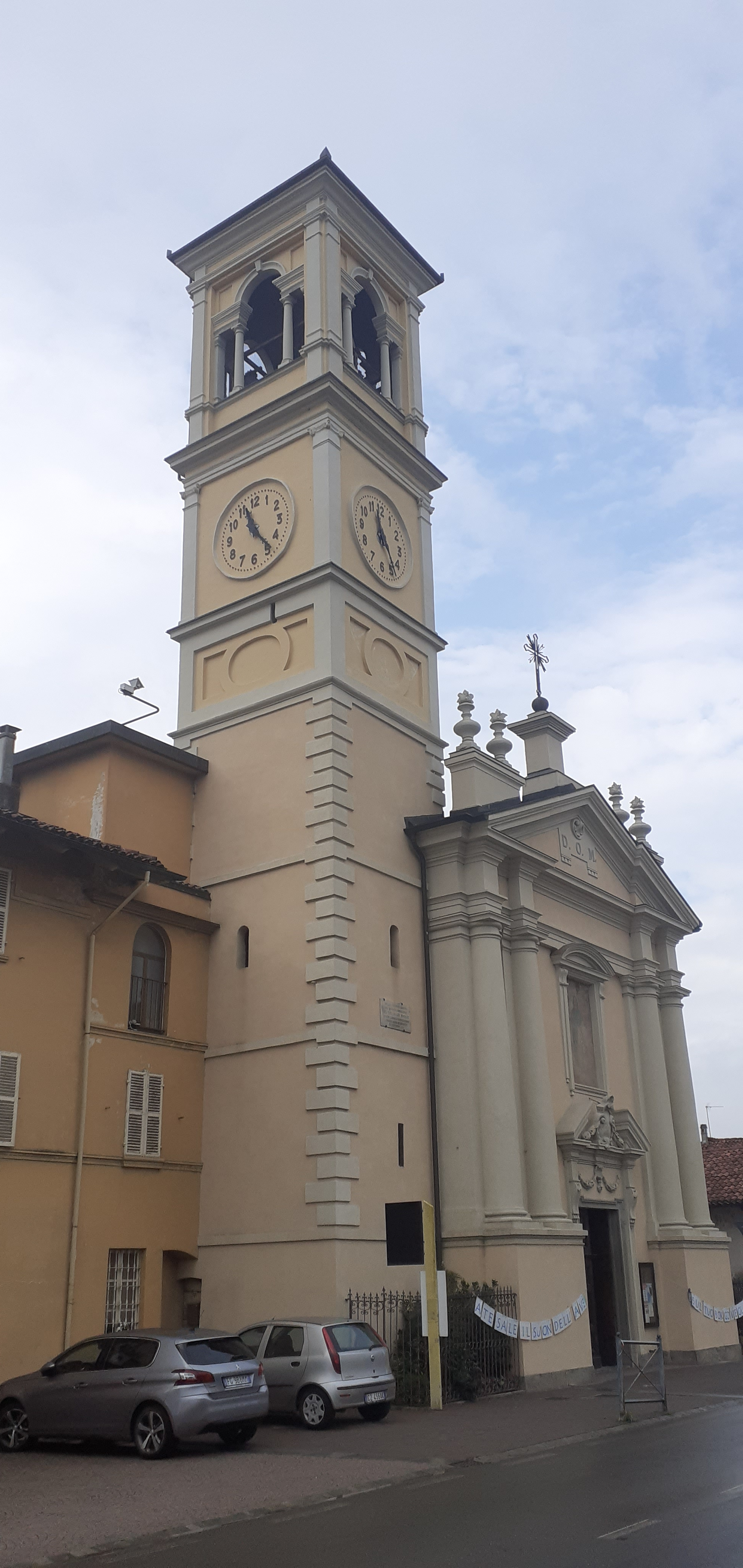
Church of Saint Mary of the Snow, frazione Salsasio

- Abbey of Casanova. It was founded by the Cistercians in the 12th century, although it was mostly rebuilt in a late Baroque style in the 18th century
- Lomellini Palace, Contemporary Art Museum (15th century)
- Castle, currently used as town hall (13th century)
- Collegiate church of Sts. Peter and Paul (1492–1514)
- Cascina Vigna, Civic Museum of Natural History
- Sant'Agostino church (1406–1437)
- San Rocco church (1699–1745)
- San Filippo church (1715–1739)
- Church of Saint Mary of the Snow (Santa Maria della Neve), Salsasio (17th century)
- Synagogue (18th century)
- Cavassa House (15th century)
- House of the Sundials (Casa delle Meridiane) or Piano House (16th century)
- San Lorenzo Hospital (1754–1856)

== Economy ==
The economy of the town is currently linked to the industry and intensive production of vegetables and cereals, which the particular soil makes very productive. Industry experienced a notable growth during the 1960s, when FIAT opened an important factory, thus attracting a growing number of immigrants from southern Italy. The rapid growth of FIAT made also possible other activities in the metallurgy, electronics, optics, chemical industry, and food industry fields. Also well-developed are the banking, financial and insurance sectors.

== Notable people born in or related to Carmagnola ==
- Francesco Bussone da Carmagnola (1380–1432), better known as Conte di Carmagnola – Renaissance Captain of Fortune, condottiero.
- Lorenzo Valerio (1810–1865) – politician
- Enrico Saroldi (1878–1954) – sculptor
- Antonio Tortone – sculptor
- Guglielmo Diatto – 19th century founder of the Diatto industrial enterprise.
- Francesca Maria Rubatto (1844–1904) – Catholic nun, founder of the Capuchin Sisters of Mother Rubatto
- Raffaello Menochio (1858–1943) – Historical scholar and engineer
- Angelo Paolo Carena (1740–1769) – Historical scholar
- Giacinto Carena (1778–1859) – Philosopher, philologist, naturalist, secretary of the Science Academy of Turin
- Dino Campana (1888–1932) – Poet
- Ferruccio Valobra (1898–1944) – Anti-fascist and partisan
- Gianluigi Lentini (1969) – Soccer player
- Umberto Mastroianni (1910–1998) – Sculptor, partisan, uncle of the actor Marcello Mastroianni
- Guido Martina (1906–1991) – Cartoonist
- Davide Longo (1971) – Writer
- Fabio Troiano (1974) – Actor
- Andrea Fiore (1850–1914) – Bishop
- Pio Marchi (1895–1942) – Soccer player
- Guido Marchi (1896–1969) – Soccer player
- Giorgio Sommacal (1961) – Cartoonist
- Eusebio Castigliano (1921–1949) – Soccer player, centre half of the Grande Torino died in the Superga air disaster
- Caterina Dominici (1829–1894) beatified in 1975
- Daniela Tuninetti (born 1973), information theorist

== Events ==
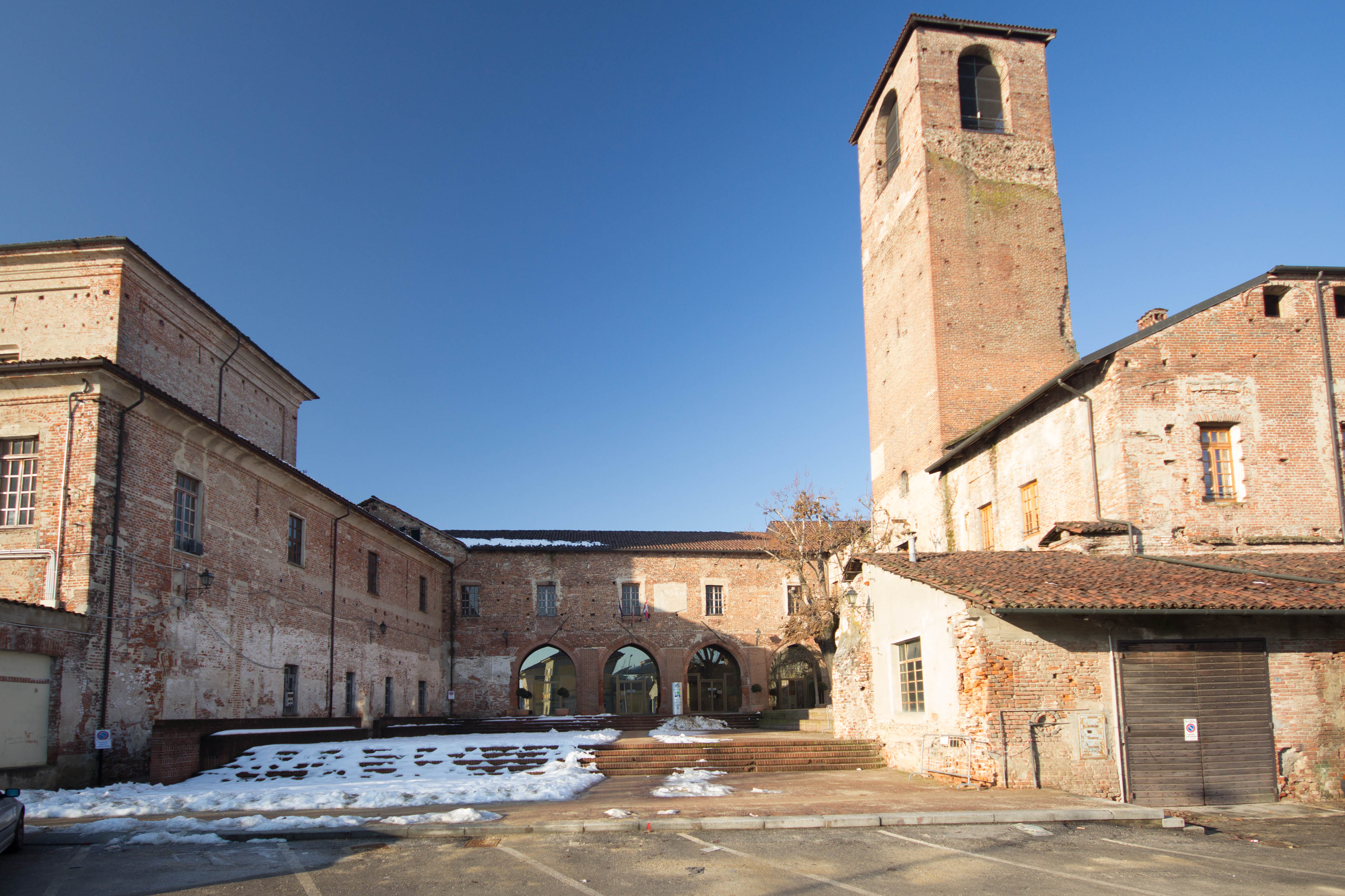
Carmagnola's Castle, townhall

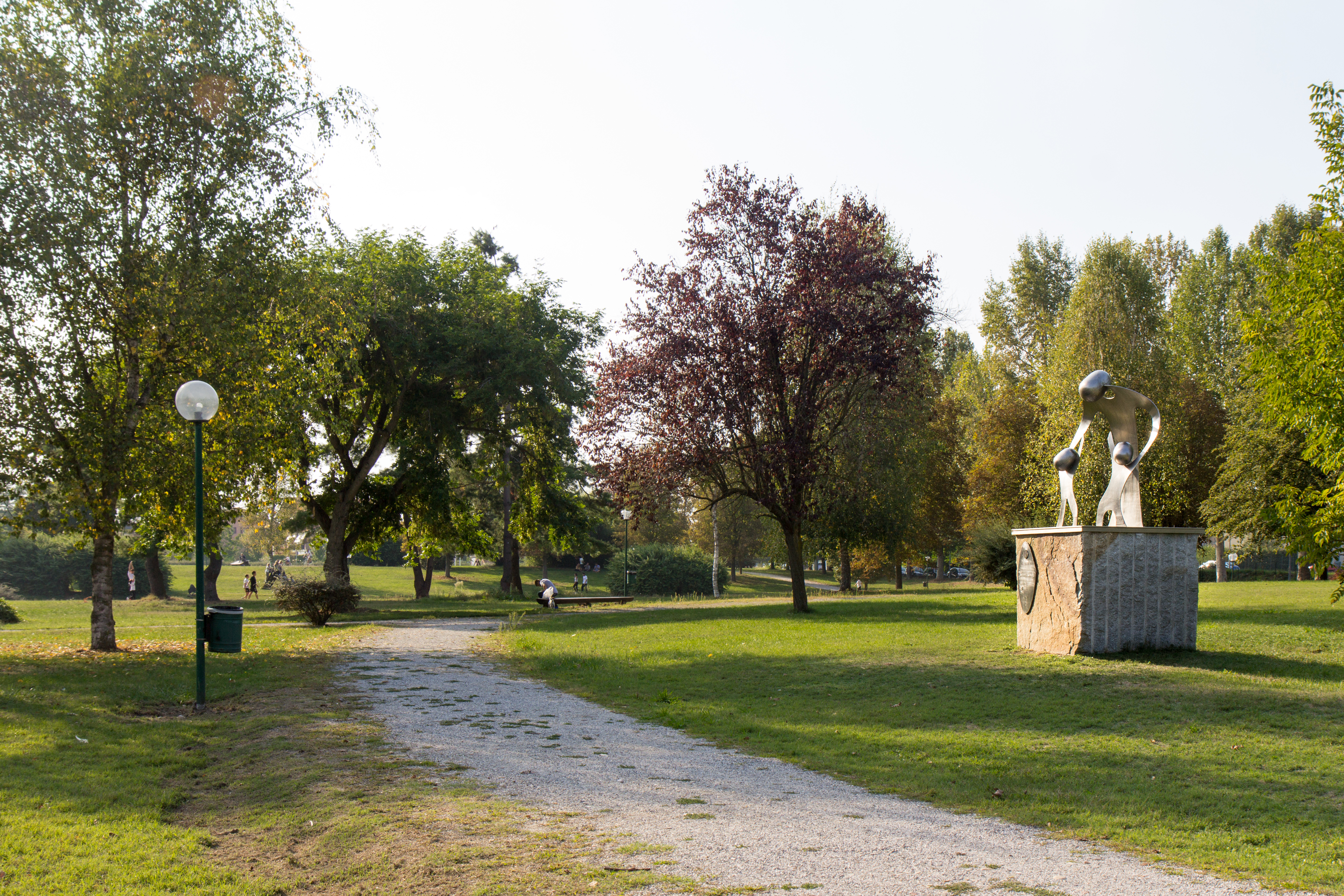
Cascina Vigna Park

- Peppers Fair (Sagra del Peperone). It is held between the last week of August and the first of September; it is an eno-gastronomic fair dedicated to the most typical product of Carmagnola's agriculture. It attracts over 250,000 visitors each year.

On 5 September 2010 during the 61st Pepper Fair the town of Carmagnola has been entered into the Guinness Book of Records for the biggest pepper soup (peperonata) with a weight of 1,190 kg (2,623.5 pounds).

- Spring Fair (Fiera di primavera). Held annually in March, dedicated to agricultural commerce, it features many collateral events.
- Mercantico. It takes place on the second Sunday of each month (except August). It is a small, antiques items' market, hosting over 400 stalls along the old town.
- Ortoflora e Natura. Held in the first weekend of April in the municipal park Cascina Vigna, the event is dedicated to gardening and horticulture.
- Grandparents' National Day (Festa Nazionale dei Nonni). It takes place in the middle of September, inside the park Cascina Vigna. It had its first edition in September 2003.
- Other events include "Carmagnola Jazz Festival", "Carmagnola Town of Art and Culture", "National Ornithological Contest", "Regional Beef Cattle Fair".

== Twin towns ==
- Opatija, Croatia
- Río Tercero, Argentina
