= Baldissero =

Baldissero may refer to

- Baldissero Canavese, comune in the Metropolitan City of Turin in the Italian region Piedmont
- Baldissero d'Alba, comune in the Province of Cuneo in the Italian region Piedmont
- Baldissero Torinese, comune in the Metropolitan City of Turin in the Italian region Piedmont

== See also ==
- Baldisseri
