= Antonio Tortone =

Antonio Tortone (Carmagnola, active 1862 -1884) was an Italian sculptor.

== Biography ==
He was a pupil of Vincenzo Vela and resident in Turin where he completed his studies at the Accademia Albertina. He exhibited frequently at the Promotrice of Turin, and in 1862, was nominated into the Album della Società of Artists in Turin. That year, along with his colleagues Cassano, Giani, Barone, and Tesio, he exhibited at the Promotrice. His submission was a stucco statue depicting Conte Camillo Benso di Cavour. In 1867, he exhibited a marble La Giovinezza.

In 1880, he exhibits a stucco representing Young Napoleon I. The next year at the Mostra Nazionale of Milan, he sent a bust of King Umberto, and in 1884 to Turin, he sent a bust of the former King Vittorio Emanuele II as well as an Eagle statue. Tortone made many sculptural portraits for illustrious person, including a stucco bust depicting senator Ercole Ricotti exhibited at Turin.

Aosta commissioned Tortone to design a Monument to Vittorio Emanuele II, who hunted frequently at a nearby park. Known as the “king-hunter”, the sculpture has a dead deer being overgrown by plants. The Galleria d’Arte Moderna of Novara has a small bronze model of the monument.
