= Sommariva del Bosco =

- Comune
- Comune di Sommariva del Bosco
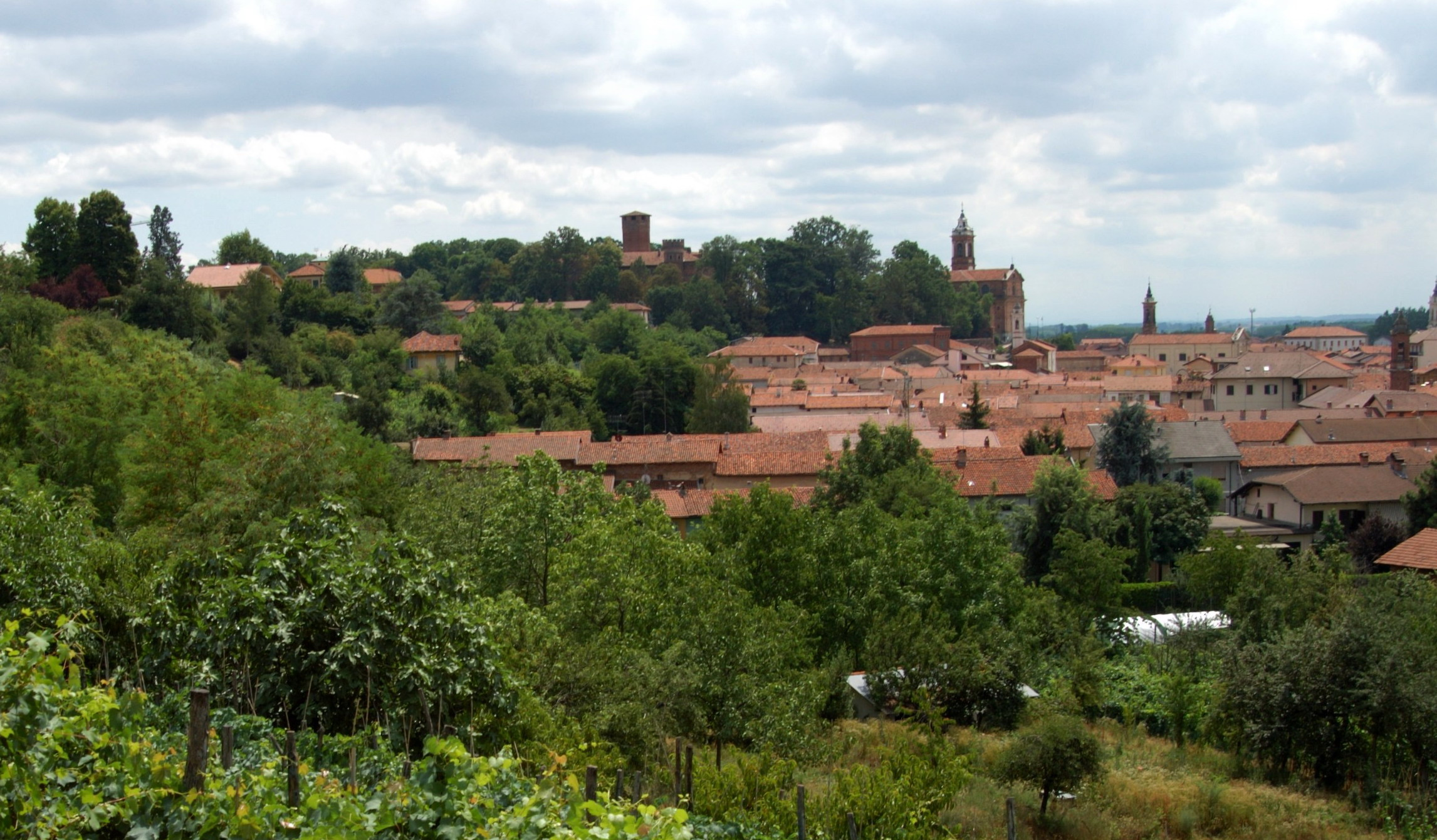

- Location within Italy Location within Piedmont
- Coordinates: 44°46′N 7°47′E
- Country: Italy
- Region: Piedmont
- Province: Cuneo (CU)

Government
  - Mayor: Matteo Pessione (Civic List)

Area
  - Total: 35.6 km^{2} (13.7 sq mi)
- Elevation: 298 m (978 ft)

Population (1-1-2017)
  - Total: 6,305
  - Density: 177/km^{2} (459/sq mi)
- Demonym: Sommarivese(i)
- Time zone: UTC+1 (CET)
  - Summer (DST): UTC+2 (CEST)
- Postal code: 12048
- Dialing code: 0172

Sommariva del Bosco is a commune (municipality) in the Province of Cuneo in the Italian region Piedmont, located about 35 kilometres (22 mi) south of Turin and about 45 kilometres (28 mi) northeast of Cuneo. As of 1 January 2017, it had a population of 6 304 and an area of 35.6 square kilometres (13.7 mi^{2}).

Sommariva del Bosco borders the following municipalities: Baldissero d'Alba, Caramagna Piemonte, Carmagnola, Cavallermaggiore, Ceresole Alba, Racconigi, Sanfrè, and Sommariva Perno.

== Notable people ==
- Clotilde Fasolis, former alpine skier
- Noemi Procopio, forensic scientist

== Twin towns ==
Sommariva del Bosco is twinned with:

- Porteña, Argentina, since 1998
