= Diatto Ottovù Zagato =

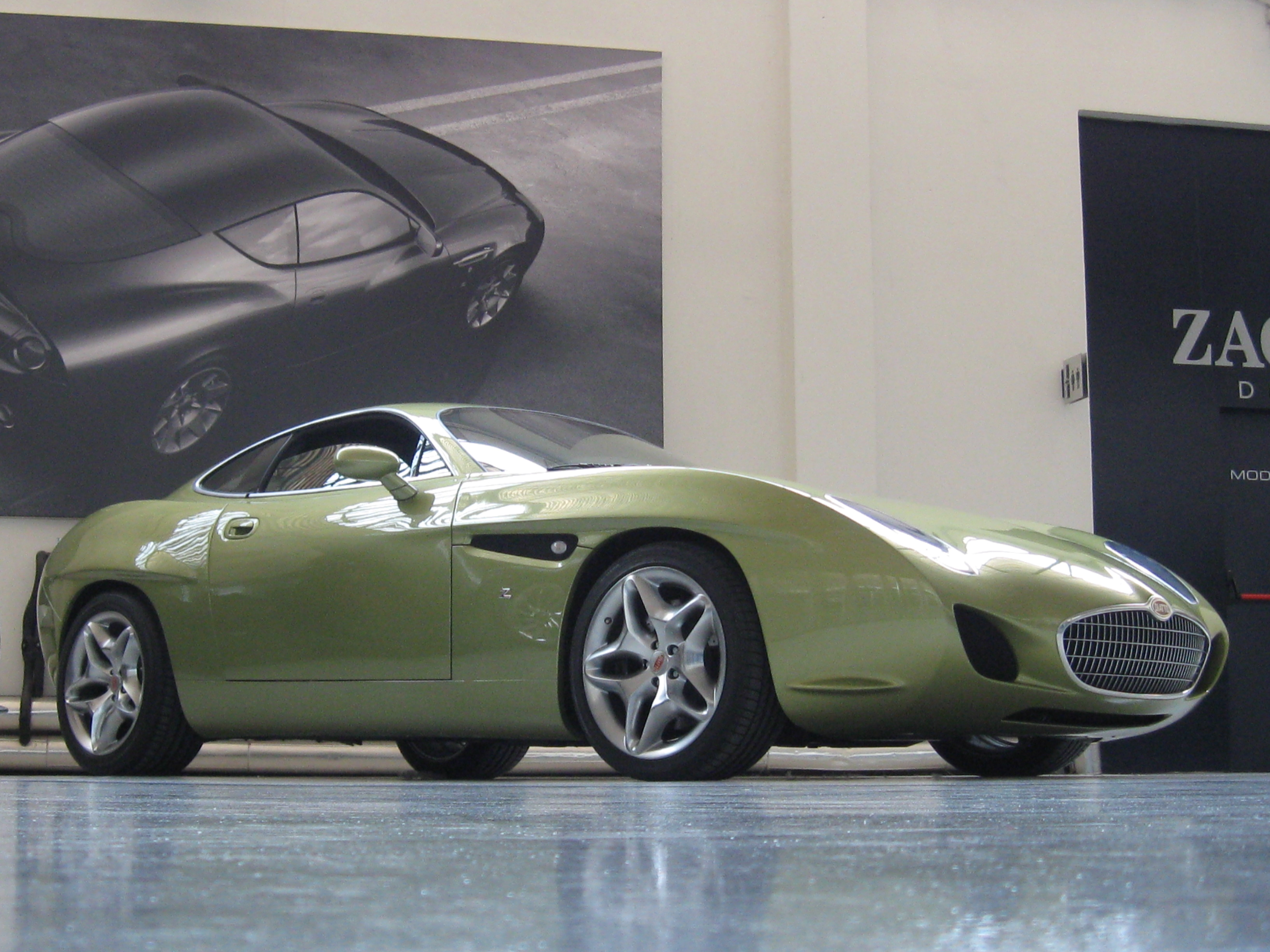

Overview
- Manufacturer: Diatto
- Production: 2008 - 2011
- Designer: Zagato

Body and chassis
- Class: Grand tourer
- Body style: 2-door 2+2 coupé
- Layout: FMR layout

Powertrain
- Engine: 4.6 L (4,600 cc) supercharged V8
- Transmission: 6-speed manual or automatic

Dimensions
- Curb weight: 1,300 kg (2,900 lb)

The Diatto Ottovù Zagato is a sports car designed and built by Milanese coachbuilder Carrozzeria Zagato for two of its clients. Coinciding with the 100th anniversary of the Diatto brand, the car made its official public debut at the 2007 Geneva Motor Show.

== History ==
In 1921, Ugo Zagato designed a lightweight and aerodynamic body for the Diatto 25 4DS chassis. Created in 1835 with a Perfected Wheel patent, Diatto made their first car in 1905 and often crossed paths with Zagato in their close collaboration with Ettore Bugatti, the Maserati brothers and Tazio Nuvolari.

The word "Ottovù" incidentally means "V8" in Italian, an indication of the engine powering the car. The word Otto appears, in various forms, three times in the car's name.

A limited production run of 99 cars was planned, although the total number produced is unknown.

== Specifications and performance ==
The Ottovù uses a steel frame with an aluminum body, with the engine mounted in a front-mid engine layout, and can seat four passengers. The car is powered by a Cosworth and Roush tuned supercharged 4.6 L 32-valve V8 engine paired with either a 6-speed manual or automatic transmission. It reportedly produces around 530 bhp (395 kW) and 690 N⋅m (509 lb⋅ft) of torque. Zagato claimed it could accelerate from 0–100 km/h (0–62 mph) in under 4 seconds and reach a top speed of over 300 km/h (190 mph).

== Gallery ==
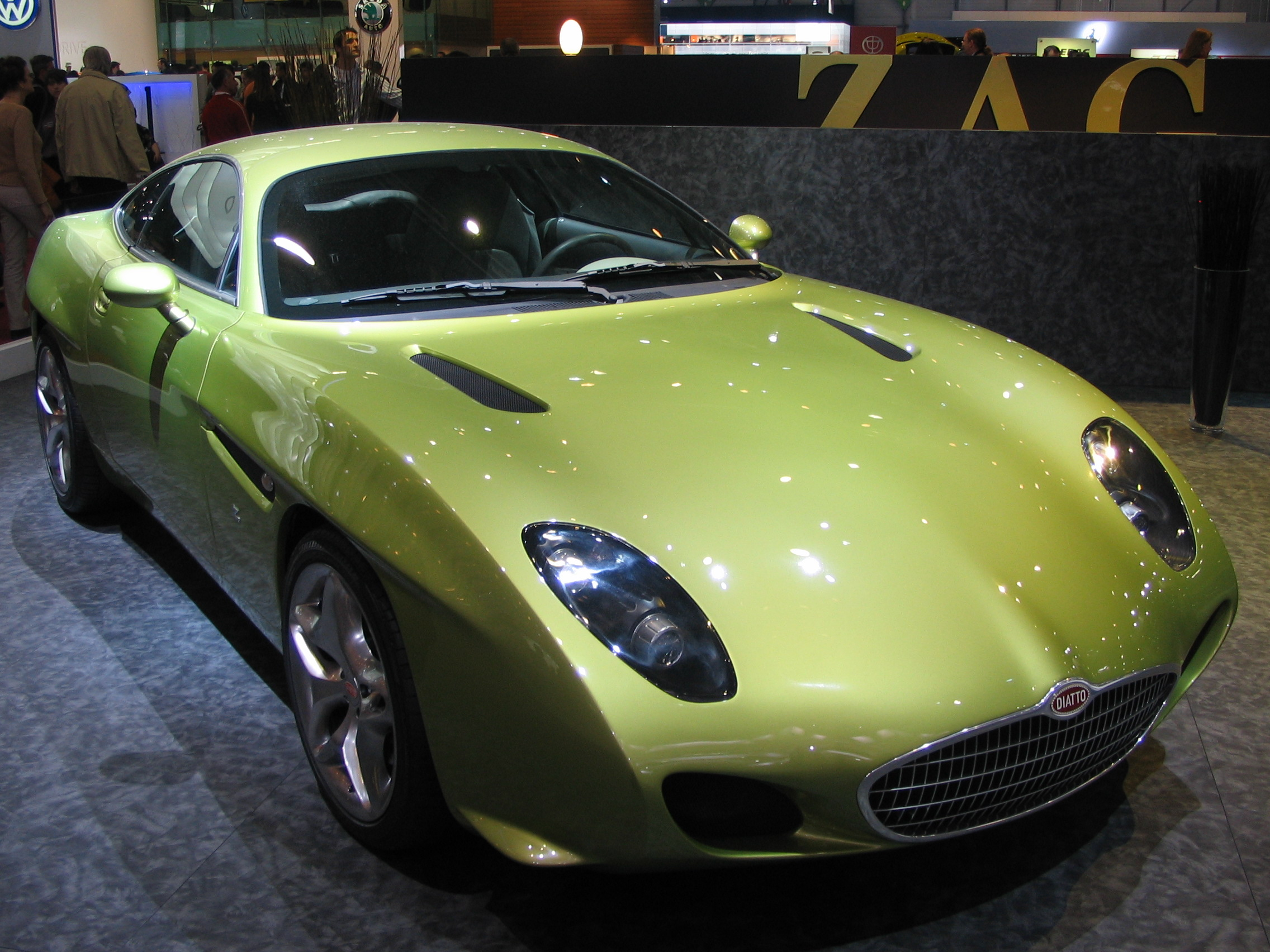

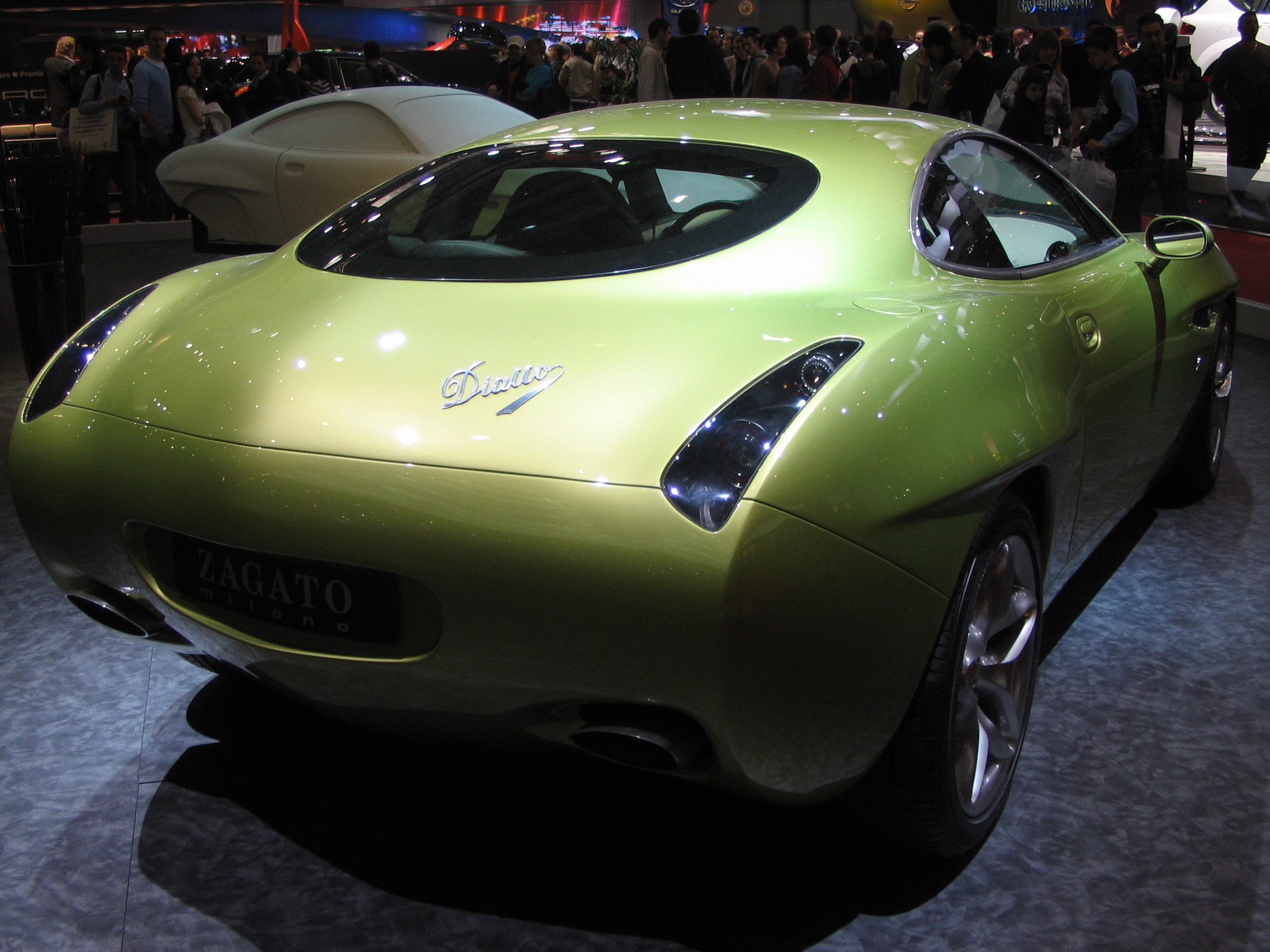

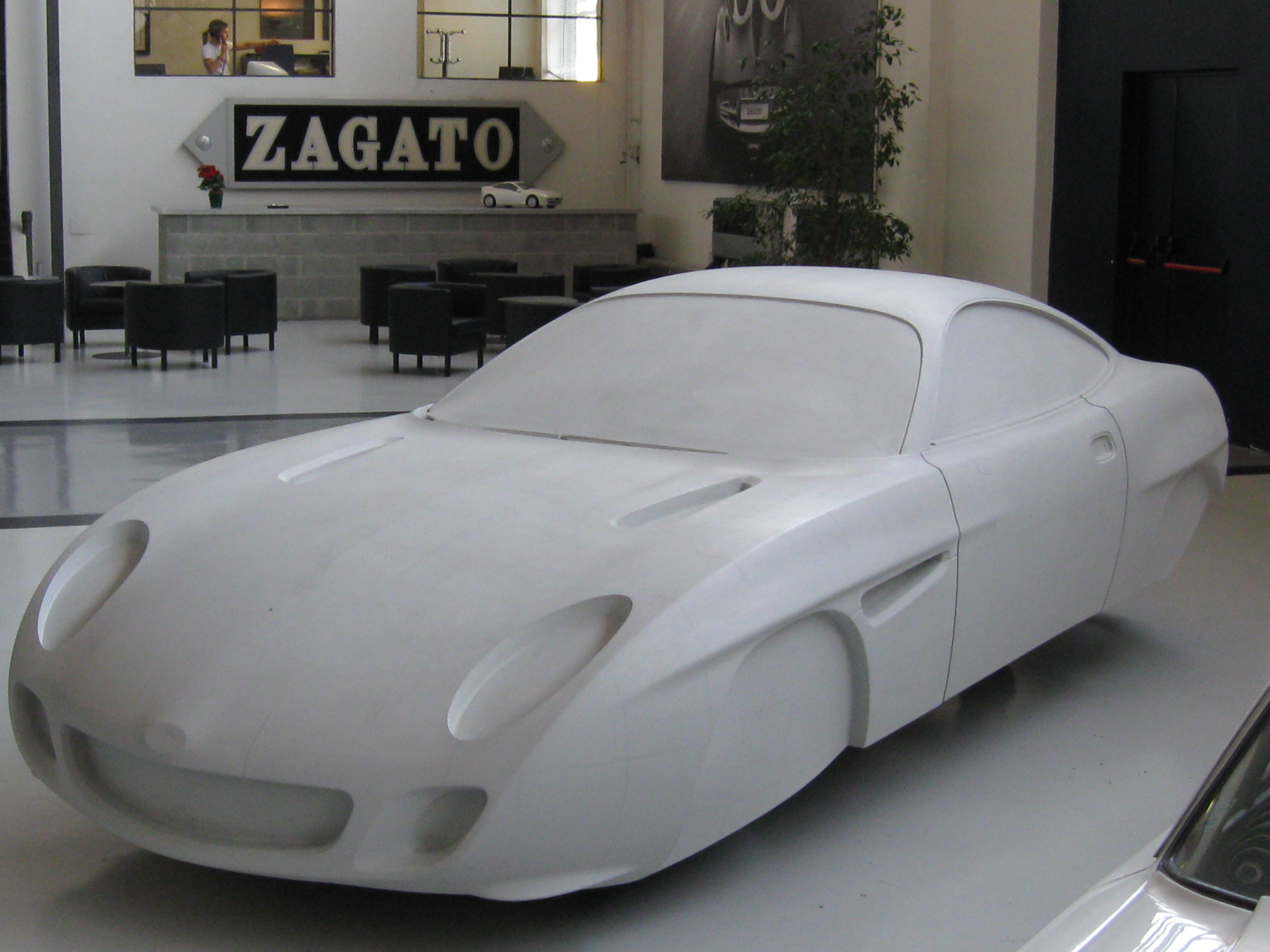
