= Clement Sefa-Nyarko =

Ghanaian academic

- Born: December 1977 (age 48)
- Citizenship: Ghanaian
- Education: La Trobe University; King's College London; University of Ghana
- Employer: King's College London
- Awards: UKRI Future Leaders Fellowship (2025); Humanities and Social Sciences Graduate Researcher Award (2020)
- Website: Clement Sefa-Nyarko - KCL

Clement Sefa-Nyarko (born December 1977), is a Ghanaian academic and senior lecturer in security, development and leadership with the African Leadership Centre at King's College London.

Sefa-Nyarko was one of 77 early-career researchers awarded the 2025 Future Leaders Fellowship by UKRI. Two other King's College London researchers, Timothy Neate and Sarah Morgan, were also selected for the £120 million interdisciplinary research scheme.

== Early life and education ==
Born in Ghana, Sefa-Nyarko studied sociology and religious studies at the University of Ghana earning a BA and an MA in related disciplines. He completed an MA in Conflict, Security and Development at King's College London and a doctoral degree at La Trobe University in Australia critically appraising the natural resource curse discourse through a political theory lens.

== Career ==
Sefa-Nyarko's work focuses on research design, political methodology and natural resource governance, with an emphasis on energy transition and climate-related policy in Africa and Australia.

He has conducted research in Ghana, Kenya, South Sudan and Nigeria, and has provided analysis for international media outlets such as the BBC and The Ghanaian Chronicle.

His academic work includes publications on institutional design, natural resource governance and political accountability in journals such as Energy Research & Social Science, Third World Quarterly and African Evaluation Journal.

Sefa-Nyarko is a senior lecturer at the African Leadership Centre (ALC), King's College London, where he teaches and conducts research on resource governance and energy transitions. He is also an alumnus of the ALC, which maintains a continental network of fellows and alumni working on security, development and leadership in Africa.

In September 2025, the UK Research and Innovation (UKRI) announced that he was among 77 recipients of the Future Leaders Fellowship, a £120 million programme supporting interdisciplinary research across health, energy, technology, social sciences and creative fields.

== Selected publications ==
Sefa-Nyarko, Clement (2024). "Ghana's National Energy Transition Framework: Domestic aspirations and mistrust in international relations complicate 'justice and equity'". Energy Research & Social Science. 110 103465. doi:10.1016/j.erss.2024.103465.

Sefa-Nyarko, Clement (2024). "The crisis of leadership in minerals governance in Ghana: Could process leadership fill the void?". The Extractive Industries and Society. 18 101470. doi:10.1016/j.exis.2024.101470.

Sefa-Nyarko, Clement; Agbe, E.; Afram, A.; Hodor, R.; Ofori-Davis, L.; Bediako, A.; Owusu, E. A. (2024). "Unpacking locally led research and evaluation through the lens of collaborative autoethnography". African Evaluation Journal. 12 (2): 1–14. doi:10.4102/aej.v12i2.730.

Sefa-Nyarko, Clement (2022). "Institutional design of Ghana and the Fourth Republic: On the checks and balances between the state and society". Third World Quarterly. 43 (8): 2006–2224. doi:10.1080/01436597.2022.2079487.

Sefa-Nyarko, Clement; Okafor-Yarwood, Ifesinachi; Boadu, Emmanuel S. (2021). "Petroleum revenue management in Ghana: How does the right to information law promote transparency, accountability and monitoring of the annual budget funding amount?". The Extractive Industries and Society. 8 (3) 100957. doi:10.1016/j.exis.2021.100957.

Sefa-Nyarko, Clement (2022). "The liminality of institutional design of petroleum governance in Ghana: Political will, political settlements and contentions as defining factors". Energy Research & Social Science. 92 102799. doi:10.1016/j.erss.2022.102799.

Sefa-Nyarko, Clement (2020). "Ethnicity in electoral politics in Ghana: Colonial legacies and the Constitution as determinants". Critical Sociology. doi:10.1177/0896920520943263.

Sefa-Nyarko, Clement (2016). "Civil war in South Sudan: Is it a reflection of historical secessionist and natural resource wars in "Greater Sudan"?". African Security. 9 (3): 188–210. doi:10.1080/19392206.2016.1208476.

== See also ==
- UK Research and Innovation
- African Leadership Centre
- Folahanmi Aina
- Hatef Sadeghi
- Eka Ikpe
