= Ferruccio Valobra =

Italian partisan and antifascist

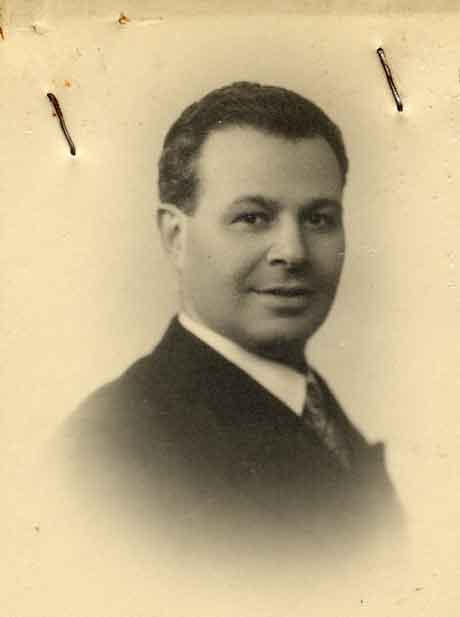
Ferruccio Valobra

Ferruccio Valobra (12 April 1898 – 22 September 1944) was an Italian partisan and antifascist.

== Life ==
Ferruccio Valobra was born in Turin from a Jewish family. Captain of the Alpini during the First World War, he was decorated with the Silver Medal of Military Valor.

In the post-war period, he worked as an industrial expert and sales representative. He was married and the father of a child. Radiated from the army following the 1938 Fascist racial laws, at the outbreak of the Second World War he was forced to displace to Carmagnola in the frazione of San Bernardo. Of anti-fascist ideas, he joined the Italian Republican Party, then clandestine.

After the Badoglio Proclamation of 8 September 1943, he took part in the Carmagnola's resistance and became commander (Capitano Rossi) of a partisan group operating in the surrounding area. Betrayed by an anonymous delator on 8 September 1944, he was incarcerated and tortured by elements of the Fascist Guardia Nazionale Repubblicana, the so-called repubblichini. He was sentenced to death by firing squad on 21 September 1944 and he was executed the following day in the Martinetto shooting range in Turin. Before his death, Valobra managed to write two letters, which ended with the words addressed to his wife and daughter:

He expressed hope that his sacrifice, along with that of his companions, would contribute to a better future for Italy, in line with the aspirations they had long shared.

Ferruccio Valobra is buried in the Jewish cemetery of Carmagnola. The central street of the town is dedicated to him today. In the current Martinetto Shrine there is a plaque commemorating his sacrifice.

== See also ==
- Jewish resistance in German-occupied Europe
