= Caterina Dominici =

Italian Roman Catholic nun

Blessed Caterina Dominici
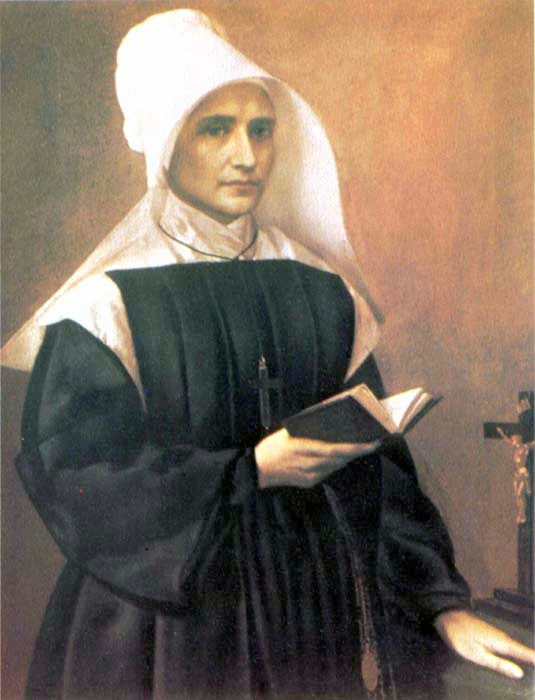

Nun
- Born: 10 October 1829; Borgo Salsasio, Carmagnola, Kingdom of Sardinia
- Died: 21 February 1894 (aged 64); Turin, Kingdom of Italy
- Venerated in: Roman Catholic Church
- Beatified: 7 May 1978, Saint Peter's Square, Vatican City by Pope Paul VI
- Feast: 21 February
- Attributes: Nun's habit; Book; Crucifix

Caterina Dominici (10 October 1829 – 21 February 1894) was an Italian Roman Catholic nun who took the name of Maria Enrichetta after she became a nun of the Sisters of Saint Anne. During the 1854 Broad Street cholera outbreak she cared for and ministered to countless people. She then went on to serve for over three decades as the Superior General of her congregation. She was also a friend and adviser to John Bosco.

She was beatified on 7 May 1978 by Pope Paul VI, and her cause for canonization is open and ongoing.

== Life ==
Caterina Dominici was born on 10 October 1829 near Turin as the fourth daughter. One brother would become a priest. She was four when her parents separated and she went with her mother and siblings to live with her priest uncle.

As a child she grew into the habit of regular confession and communion. She moved in 1848 and in November 1850 became a non-cloistered religious of the Sisters of Saint Anne. She assumed the name of "Maria Enrichetta". Pope Pius IX visited Loreto in 1857 and Dominici was present along with Madeleine Sophie Barat when the pope met with the professed religious.

Dominici was appointed as the Superior General of her congregation and she at first attempted to discourage her fellow sisters from the appointment. She travelled to India in October 1879 and Pope Leo XIII received her in a private audience in 1884.

Her health started to take a steep decline from November 1893 and was confined to bed. She continued to lead the institute despite the pain that she felt. She spent her last week in drowsiness and despite this she continued to speak in a weak voice to those around her bedside.

Dominici died in 1894 and her remains were transferred in 1926 to the chapel of the mother house.

== Beatification ==
The beatification process commenced on a local level in Turin from 1929 to 1931. Dominici's spiritual writings were approved by theologians on 28 February 1940. Her cause was formally opened on 4 April 1943, granting her the title of Servant of God. The next process spanned from 1946 to 1948. Both processes were validated in 1951 and 1952. Pope Paul VI recognized her life of heroic virtue and conferred upon her the title of Venerable on 1 February 1975.

The investigation for a miracle attributed to her intercession spanned from 1949 to 1950 and was validated in 1952. Paul VI approved it in 1977 and beatified her on 7 May 1978.
