= Diatto =

Italian automobile manufacturer

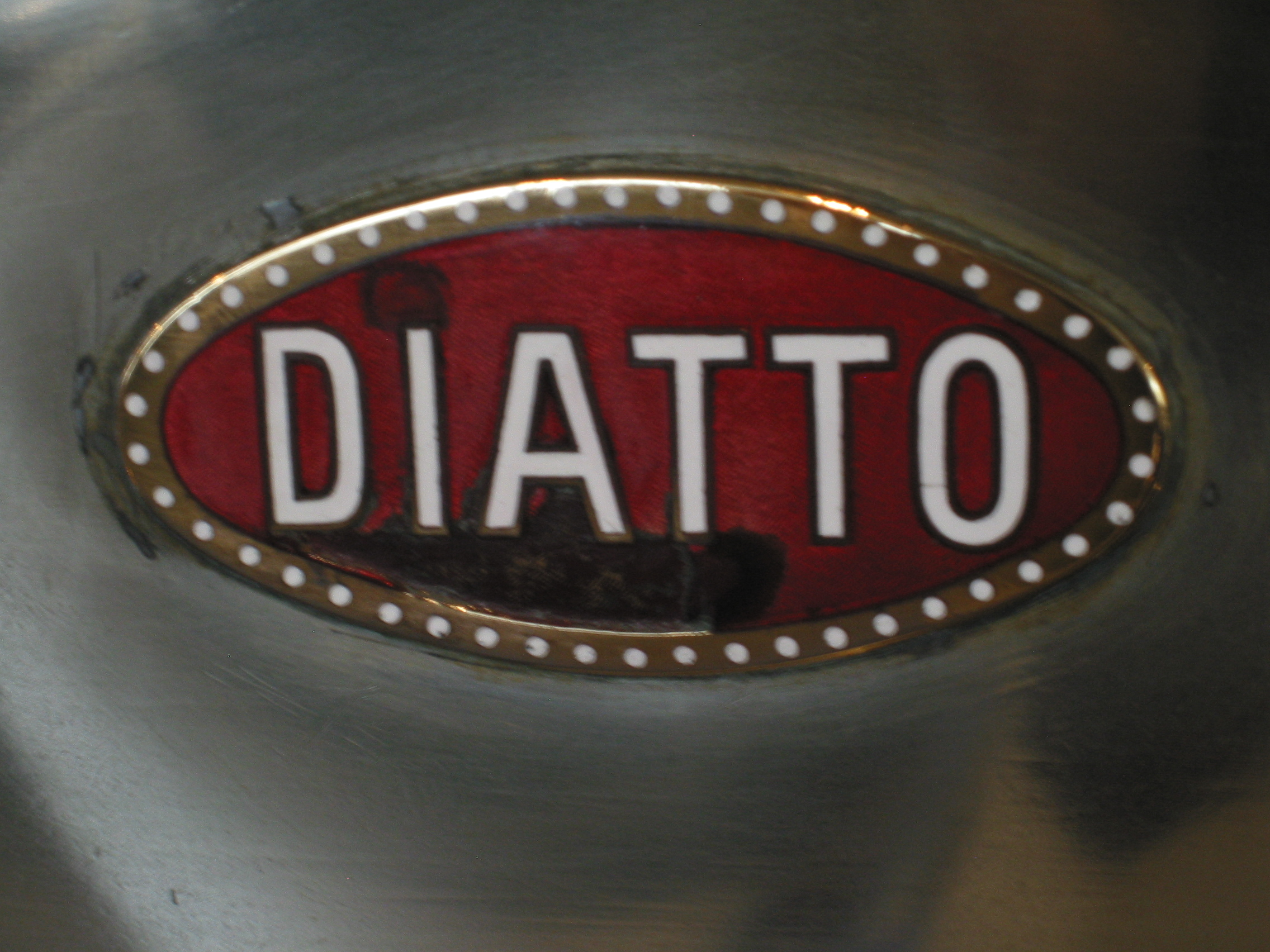
- Industry: Automotive
- Founded: 1905
- Defunct: 1955
- Fate: Ceased production
- Headquarters: Turin, Italy
- Key people: Pietro and Vittorio Diatto, founders
- Products: Automobiles

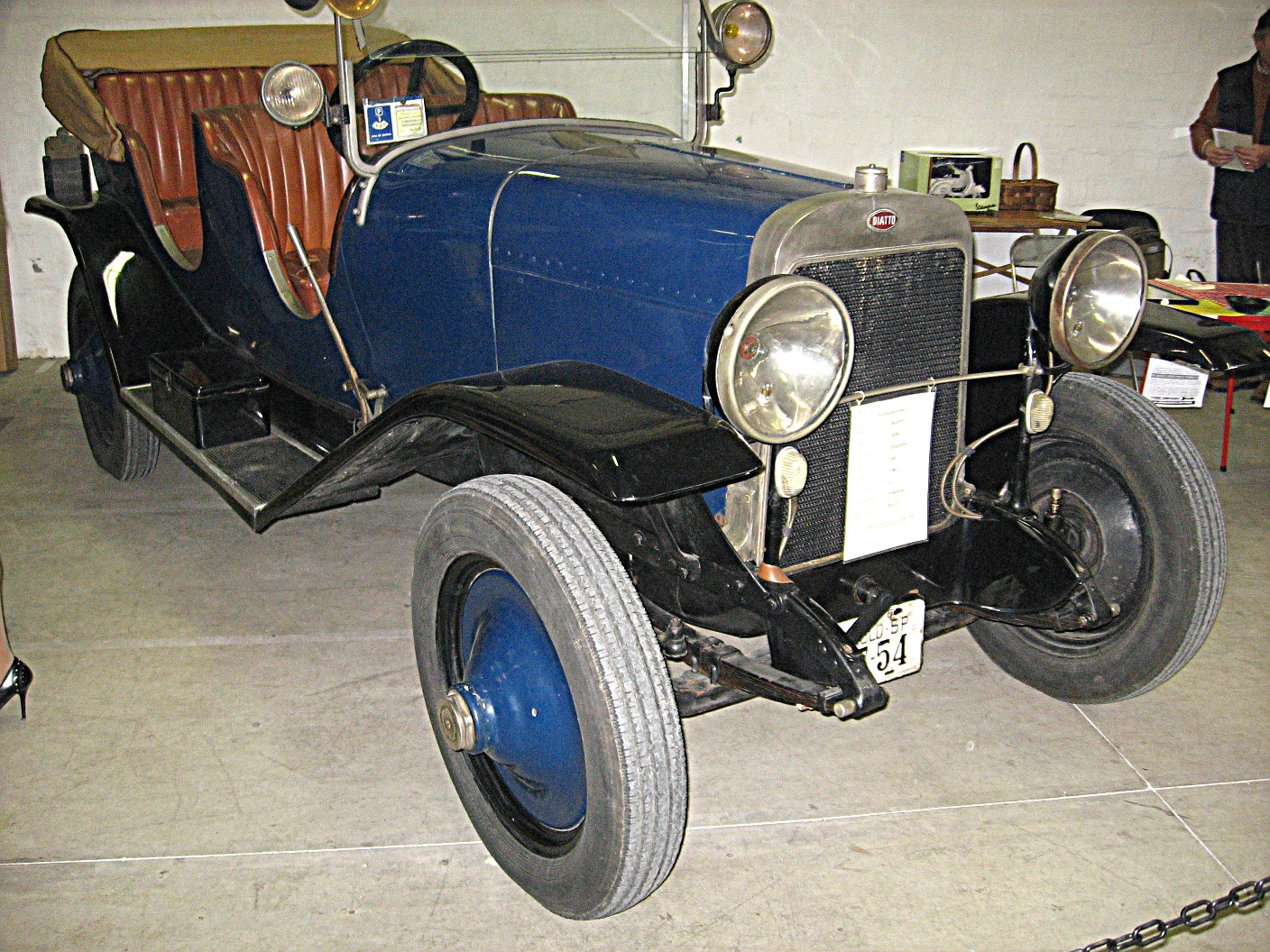
Diatto 20 DA Torpedo (1921)

Diatto was an Italian manufacturing company founded in 1835 in Turin by Guglielmo Diatto (1804–1864) to make 'carriages for wealthy customers'. In 1874 Guglielmo’s sons, Giovanni and Battista Diatto, began building railway carriages for Compagnie Internationale des Wagons-Lits and the Orient Express. In 1905 Guglielmo's grandsons, Vittorio and Pietro Diatto, began Diatto-Clément, a cooperative venture making motor-vehicles under license from French manufacturer Clément-Bayard owned by industrialist Adolphe Clément-Bayard. By 1909 they had full ownership of 'Autocostruzioni Diatto' and began developing their own motor-vehicles and exporting them worldwide.

From 1905 the company built two and four cylinder cars based on the Clément-Bayard, a leading contemporary French manufacturer. By the 1920s, Diatto was making quality cars of its own design, including race cars with supercharged eight-cylinder engines. Diatto also supplied frames to Bugatti which used them for their own race cars. Some Diatto racers were prepared and raced by Alfieri Maserati who left Diatto in 1926 to establish the Maserati marque with his brothers.

Diatto cars were known for their innovative engineering and as early as the 1920s they were equipped with four-wheel brakes and four-speed gearboxes.

Diatto ceased production in 1929.

== History ==
=== 19th century ===
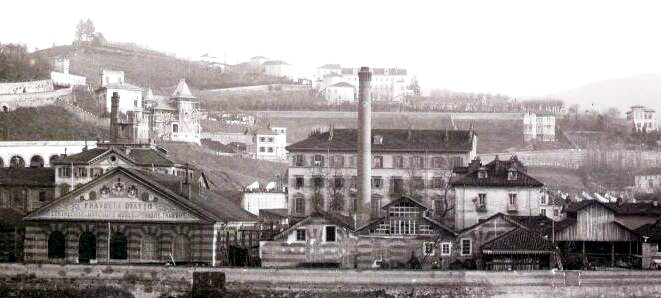
The workshop on the banks of the river Po in Turin

In 1835 Guglielmo Diatto, a 30-year-old wheelwright from Carmagnola, founded a workshop on the banks of the river Po in Turin for the manufacture and repair of carriage wheels. The business developed into building carriages for nobility and Diatto Manifattura di Carrozze (Carriage Manufacture) became a successful industrial concern.

In 1838 Guglielmo Diatto was awarded his first patent for a 'perfected wheel'. The patent is held at the 'National Museum of Automobiles' in Turin.

In 1874 the founder’s sons, Giovanni and Battista, began building luxury railway carriages for Compagnie des Wagons Lits et des Grands Express Europeens of Paris who ran the Orient Express, the Nord Express, the Sud Express and the Transsibérien across Russia.

=== Diatto-Clément ===
In 1905 the grandsons of the founder, Vittorio and Pietro Diatto, believed that motor-vehicle production represented the future for the 'carriage market'. On 12 April 1905, they founded the Società Diatto-A. Clement in partnership with the French company Clément-Bayard, owned by Adolphe Clément-Bayard of Paris. Diatto-Clément had a workforce of 500 (Note: Fiat had 776) and produced cars with 4 and 6 cylinder engines.

The company achieved significant sporting success from the outset. In 1906 it won the Herkomer Competition in Germany against 134 competitors (1800 km from Frankfurt to Innsbruk); the Lugano-San Gottardo (speed trial over 7 hours through the mountain passes) in Switzerland; and the Italian Gold Cup, defeating 48 competitors over 4000 km in 11 daily stages across Italy.

It also won the 1907 Cannes Cup, for fuel economy and the 1908 Saint Petersburg-Moscow 700 km race.

=== Autocostruzioni Diatto ===
In 1909 the Diatto brothers bought out Adolphe Clément-Bayard and renamed the company 'Autocostruzioni Diatto'. The new company continued with its sporting reputation and traded on the slogan : Queen of lightweight vehicles, fast, comfortable, elegant.

The company developed a worldwide sales and support network, with vehicles being exported to :

- Argentina,
- Australia,
- Austria,
- Brazil,
- Canada,
- Cuba,
- France,
- Germany,
- Poland,
- Russia,
- Spain,
- Switzerland,
- United Kingdom,
- USA

In the year 1911, 100 automobiles were manufactured. From 1912 onwards Diatto expanded rapidly, becoming one of the top Italian industrial groups. In 1915, it acquired both the Scacchi factory in Chivasso, in which the workforce of 100 built five cars per month, (Note: The Scacchi factory in Chivasso had been founded in 1911 by Cesare Scacchi, previously a workshop supervisor at Fiat.) and the 'Vetture Automobili Leggere Torino' (V.A.L.T.) factory.de:Vetture Automobili Leggere Torino (Note: The 'Vetture Automobili Leggere Torino' (V.A.L.T.) factory was built in 1911, and after the Diatto stripping of workforce and plant it was acquired by the British industrialist John Newton.) It then consolidated both the workforces and plant in the new factory in 'Via Frejus' (Turin) where they were able to produce over 40 units a month.

==== Gnome et Rhône ====
Diatto acquired a controlling share of the leading aviation engine manufacturer Gnome et Rhône from 'Weiter and Waugham'. Gnome manufactured around 200 rotary aviation engines per month. Under Diatto ownership their technological know-how was also integrated into the motor-vehicles.

The Gnome et Rhone 9 cylinder rotary engine won several prestigious trans-European prizes such as the Mediterranean crossing; the Gordon Bennet Cup; the Reims Meeting; plus the Raids of Friedrichshafen, Düsseldorf, Cuxhaven, Zeebrugge, and Dunkerque. The build-up to World War 1 lead to orders for 5,000 aviation engines for Italy, Russia, France and United Kingdom.

==== 1920s ====
After the First World War they added 8 cylinder supercharged engines with aluminium pistons and 4 valves per cylinder, up to 6,000 cc.

==== 1930s, 1940s, 1950s ====
During year 1932 the company changed ownership and limited production only to spare parts for cars already produced, which was then ceased in 1955

== Revival of the marque ==
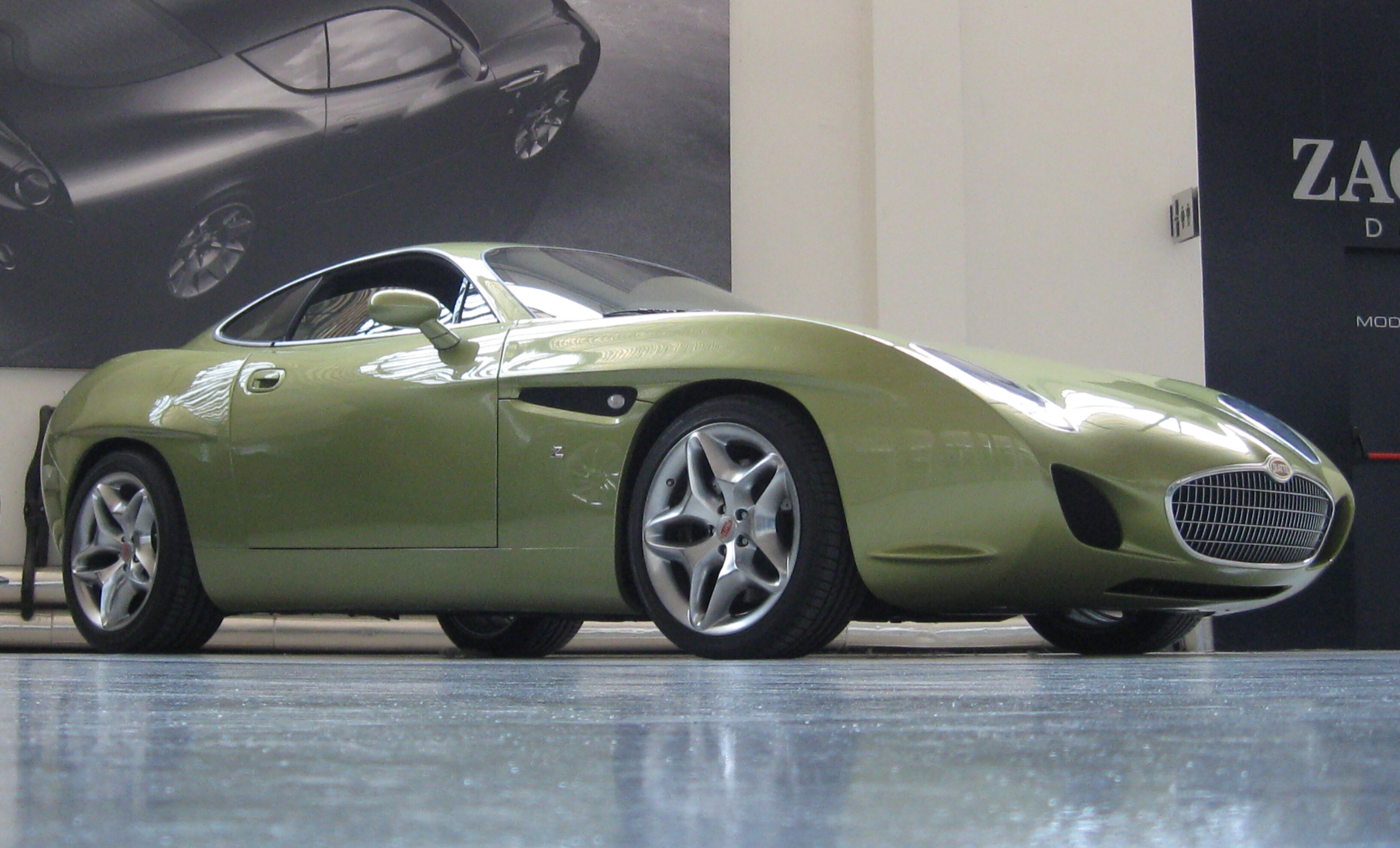
Diatto Ottovù Zagato

On 9 February 2007, Zagato announced the revival of the Diatto marque to celebrate its 100th anniversary. At the 77th Geneva Motor Show in March 2007 it unveiled a new all-aluminum sports car called the Diatto Ottovù Zagato.

== Sporting victories, Palmares ==
Diatto-Clement competition victories included:

- 1906 Herkomer Competition, Germany, against 134 competitors (1800 km from Frankfurt to Innsbruk);
- 1906 Lugano-San Gottardo (speed trial over 7 hours through the mountain passes) in Switzerland;
- 1906 Italian Gold Cup, defeating 48 competitors over 4000 km in 11 daily stages across Italy.
- 1907 Cannes Cup, for fuel economy
- 1908 Saint Petersburg-Moscow 700 km race.

Autocostruzioni Diatto competition victories included :

- 1909 Italy - Modena “Mile record”;
- 1910 UK - Brooklands;
- 1913 Italy - Parma-Poggio di Berceto (the Race to the mountain);
- 1914 Spain - Barcelona “Rebassada Cup”;
- 1914 France - “Tourist Cup” (3120 km, economy and efficiency prizes with the lowest fuel consumption);
- 1914 Italy - the Milan-Sanremo (320 km reliability trial).
- 1923 Italy - 'Circuito del Garda' won by Guido Meregalli.

== See also ==
- List of Italian companies
