= Abbey of Casanova, Carmagnola =

Monastery in Carmagnola, Italy

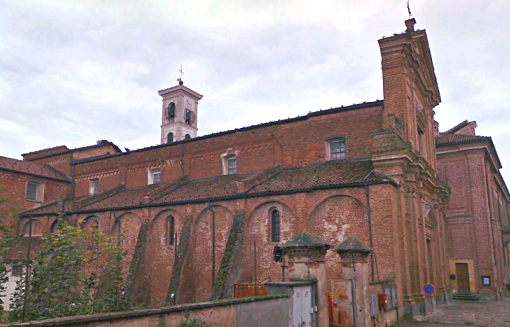
Side view of church, with bell-tower and abbey behind.

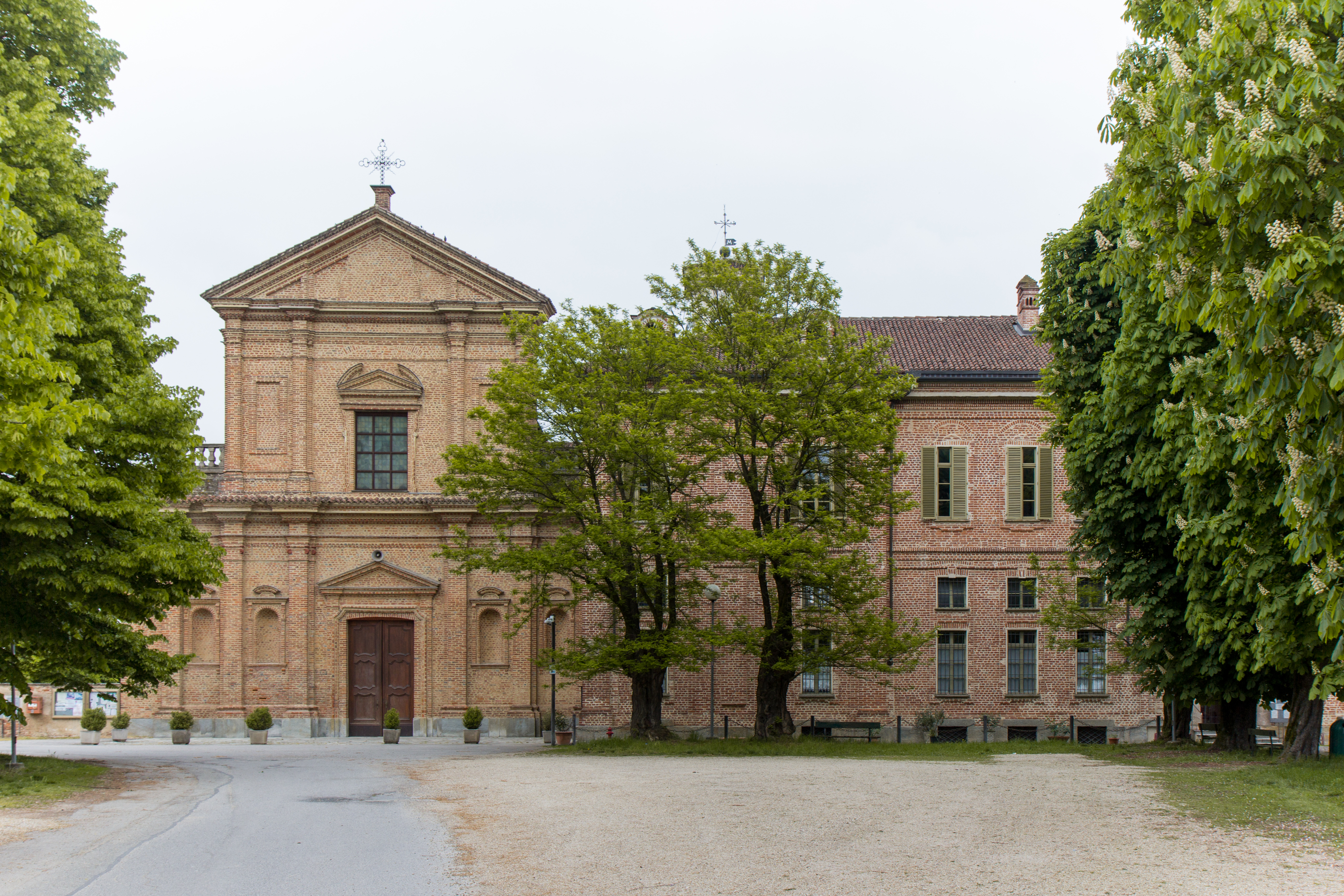
Facade of Church

The Abbey of Casanova (Italian: Abbazia di Casanova) is a former Cistercian monastery located in Carmagnola, in the region of the Piedmont, Italy. The Roman Catholic church building functions in 2019 as a parish temple.

== History ==
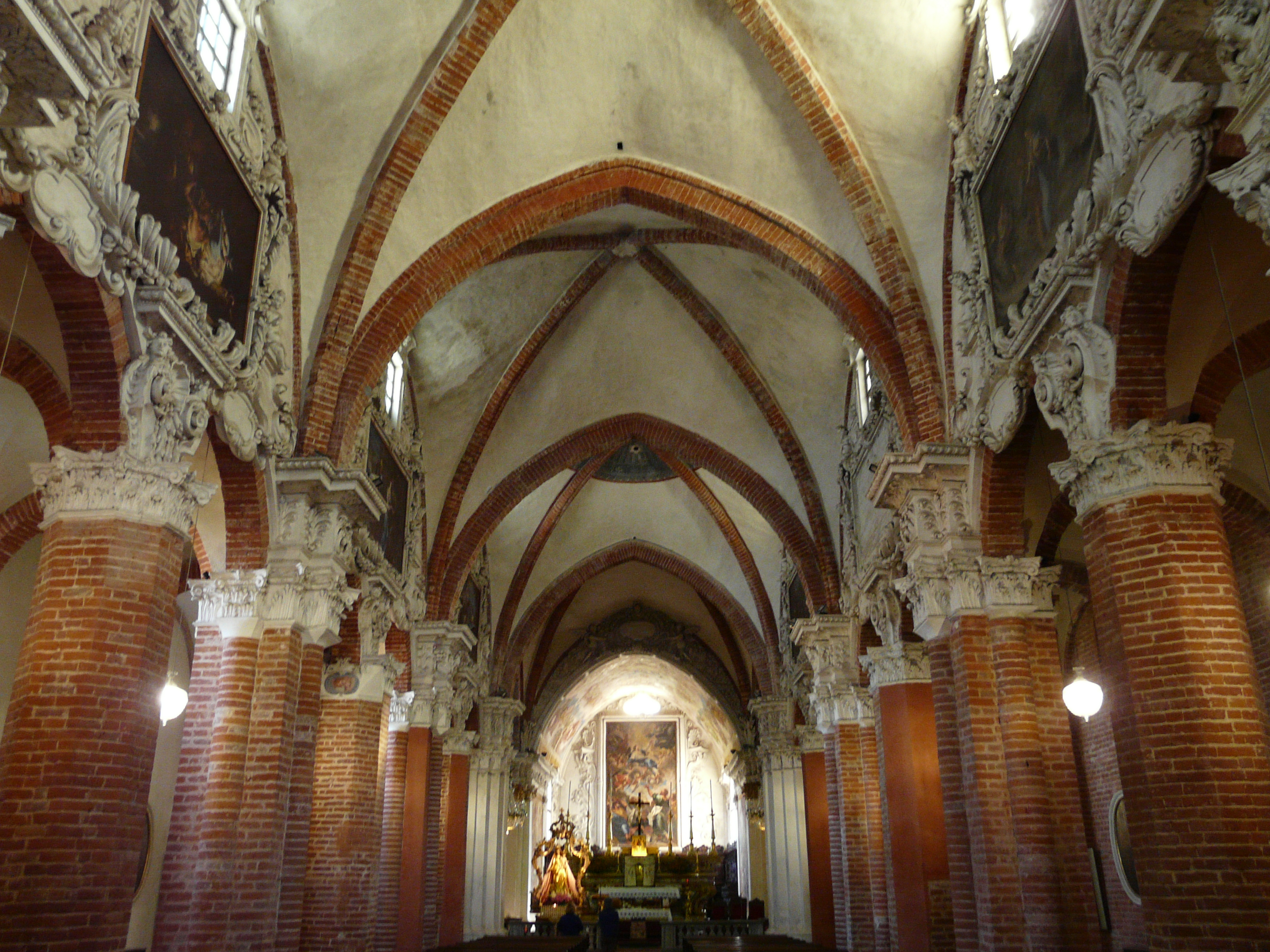
View towards apse along center nave

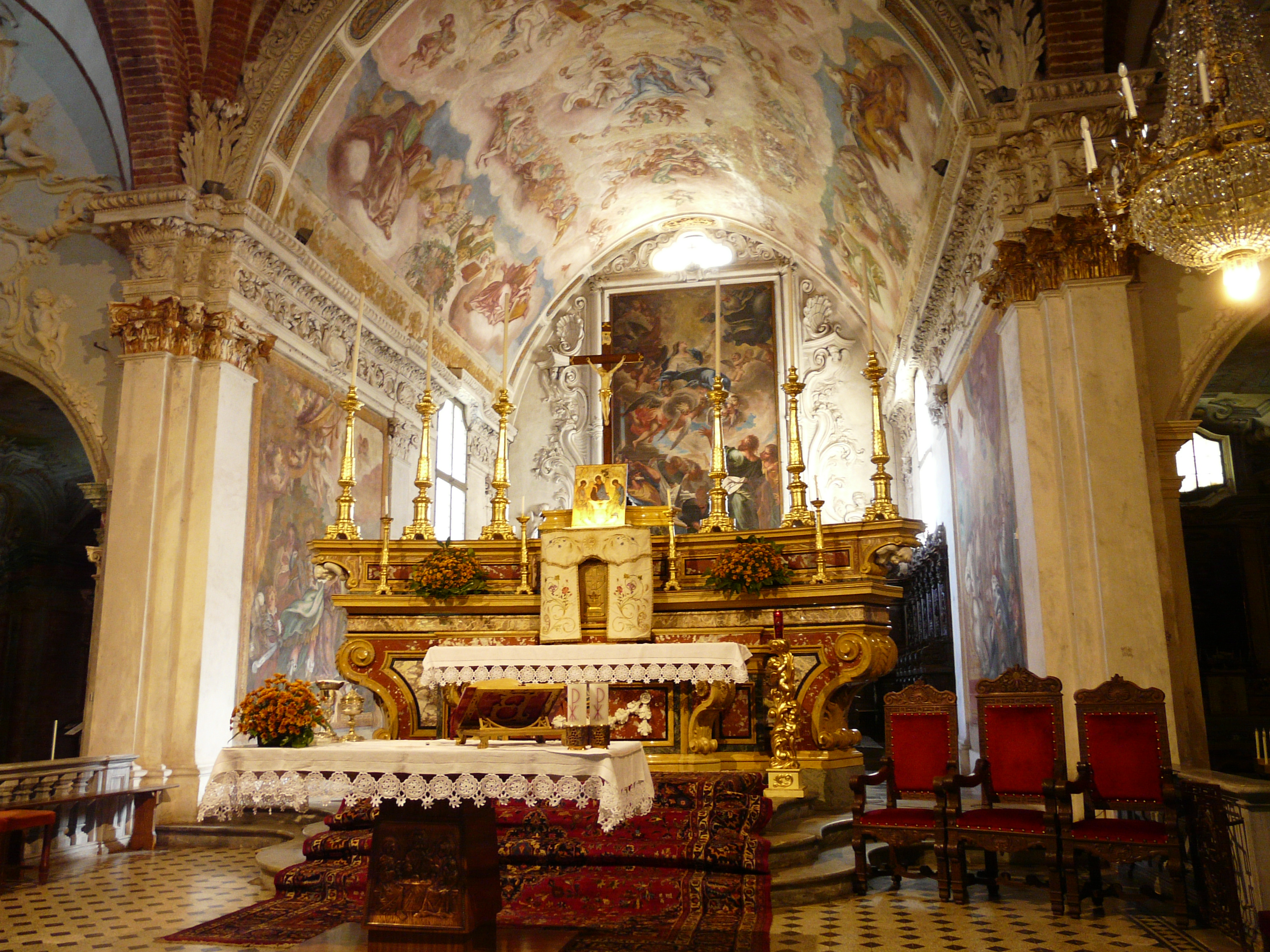
Main altar with choir behind

A monastery at the site was begun in the mid-12th century after a donation by the Marquis of Saluzzo to the Cistercians. The abbey expanded its territory and wealth over the next few centuries. In 1567, Emanuele Filiberto, Duke of Savoy, began restricting the exemptions and property that had enriched the abbey. There began to be a controversy over who could name the abbot of the monastery, a post occupied by varied well-connected individuals including the cardinal Marco Sittico di Altemps, Bishop of Costanza, during 1569 to 1581, and the Cardinal Maurizio of Savoy during 1618 to 1642. The Prince Eugene of Savoy, became abbot from 1688 to 1730.

In 1642, the abbey was sacked by a Calvinist army, which destroyed the abbey library. In 1693, a French army sacked the abbey. In Pope Pius VI suppressed the monastery, and converted the church into a parish temple.

The original church building dated to the 12th century, but the present church is due to a reconstruction started in 1680 in a Baroque style. Some internal elements retain Gothic or Romanesque elements. The church has three naves and a large transept, with an apse located in the eastern end. Along the lateral naves are four chapels, further chapels open from the transept and apse. The apse had to be rebuilt in 1712, likely a design by Francesco Gallo. The bell-tower was added in 1825.

Between 1743 and 1753, the monastery was nearly completely rebuilt after large fire, in a design by Giovanni Tomaso Prunotto. It is now privately owned.

Between 1681 and 1695, over a dozen canvases depicting the life of the Virgin and Jesus were painted by Federico Cervelli; ten of these are in the main nave area. The stations of the via crucis of the lateral nave were painted in the late 18th century by Vittorio Amedeo Rapous, Giovenale Bongiovanni, and Giovanni Giovenale. A Baptism of Christ in the baptistry was painted by Gerolamo Bongiovanni. The main altarpiece depicts the Assumption of Mary (1685) by Cervelli.

The apse ceiling and walls, above the choir, were frescoed by Bartolomeo Guidobono. On the left wall, is a depiction of Amedeo III of Savoy (1095-1148) founding the Abbey of Hautecombe in 1125. In the center, is a depiction of Umberto III of Savoy (1129-1189) joining the said abbey.

The intaglio wooden choir (1685) was completed by Giacomo Braeri. The left tribune of the transept has a 19th-century organ built by Carlo Vittino. On the right was the royal tribune used by the king Vittorio Emanuele II when he attended mass during his hunting trips to the region. The transept has four more large Cervelli canvases.

The chapels of Saints Bernard and Benedict were painted by followers of Bartolomeo Guidobono. The two other chapels, dedicated to the Virgin of the Rosary and an St Joseph were painted by Guidobono. The crypt, dating to 1688, was likely painted by Domenico Guidobono.
