= Capilla Santuario de la Beata Francisca Rubatto, Montevideo =

Roman Catholic chapel in Montevideo, Uruguay

Coordinates: 34°51′19.3″S 56°13′24″W

Capilla Santuario de la Beata Francisca Rubatto
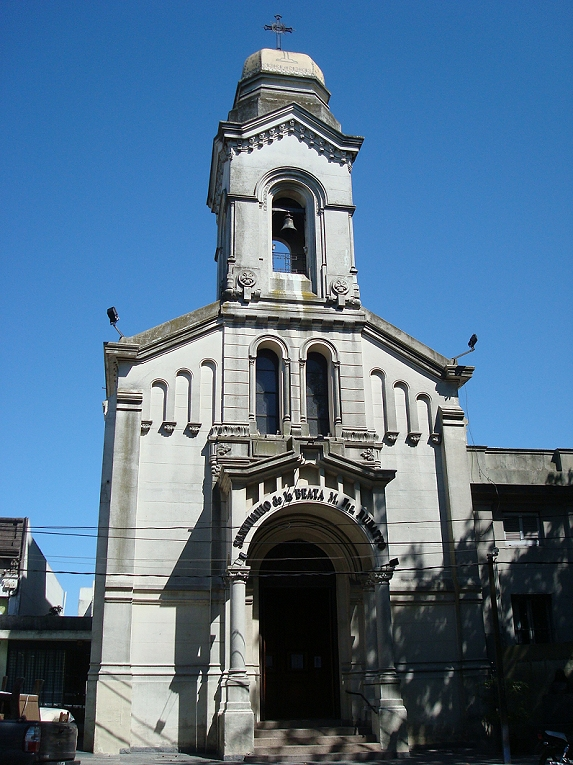

Religion
- Affiliation: Roman Catholic
- Ecclesiastical or organizational status: Sanctuary chapel

Location
- Location: Carlos María Ramírez 56; Montevideo, Uruguay
- Interactive map of Capilla Santuario de la Beata Francisca Rubatto

Architecture
- Style: Neo-Romanesque

The Sanctuary Chapel of Mother Francesca Rubatto (Spanish: Capilla Santuario de la Beata Francisca Rubatto) is a Roman Catholic chapel in Montevideo, Uruguay.

Held by the Capuchin Sisters of Mother Rubatto, it is the shrine where the remains of Saint Francesca Rubatto are venerated. It is located in the neighbourhood of Belvedere, where Mother Rubatto performed most of her work.
