= Folahanmi Aina =

Nigerian political scientist and researcher (born 1984)

- Born: 1984 (age 41–42); Osun
- Citizenship: Nigerian
- Education: Ahmadu Bello University (BSc); Seoul National University (MSc); University of Oxford (MSc); King's College London (PhD)
- Occupations: Political Scientist; Educator
- Employer: SOAS
- Spouse: Moji Alaga Aina (m. 2016)
- Awards: General Lamine Cissé Young Researcher Award (2021; Mandela Washington Fellowship (2016)
- Website: www.triolafoundation.org/about-us/

Folahanmi Aina (born June 18, 1984) is a Nigerian political scientist, international security analyst, and the founder of Triola Aina Foundation. He is known for his contributions to international security development in the Sahel region.

== Educational background ==
Folahanmi earned his Bachelor of Science (BSc) degree in political science from Ahmadu Bello University, Zaria, Nigeria. He later pursued advanced studies, obtaining a master's degree in international development policy from Seoul National University, South Korea, in 2013. In 2017, he completed a second master's degree in African studies at the African Studies Centre, University of Oxford. He further obtained a PhD in Leadership Studies from the School of Global Affairs, King's College London in 2023.

== Career ==
Folahanmi began his career in 2011 as a special assistant to the statistician general at the National Bureau of Statistics, Nigeria. In 2015, he transitioned to the role of data analyst for the Humanitarian Coordination Unit in the Office of the Vice President of Nigeria (Yemi Osinbajo). By 2018, he was serving as the leadership programme coordinator for the African Leadership Centre's ALC-PGF initiative. Folahanmi also worked as research assistant at King's College London, Research Analyst at Royal United Services Institute for Defence and Security Studies (RUSI), London, United Kingdom in 2018. and independent consultant for International Institute for Strategic Studies (IISS) in London and the Woodrow Wilson International Centre for Scholars in Washington, D.C. Additionally, he served as a Senior Research Consultant for DCAF–Geneva Centre for Security Sector Governance from 2021 to 2022 and worked as research director at the Global Network on Extremism and Technology (GNET), an academic research arm of the Global Internet Forum to Counter Terrorism. Currently, Folahanmi is a Lecturer, at the Department of Development, School of Oriental and African Studies (SOAS), University of London.

=== Triola Aina Foundation ===
Triola Aina Foundation, established in 2017, is a Nigerian non-profit organization headquartered in Osun State, Nigeria, with a field office in Abuja, Nigeria. The foundation is dedicated to empowering young people to become active contributors to national development through strategic initiatives focused on education, youth leadership and nation building.

== Awards and recognition ==
In 2016, Folahanmi was honoured with the Mandela Washington Fellowship by the U.S. State Department. In 2019, he was invited as a speaker and a Next Generation Delegate at the Global Food Security Symposium organized by the Chicago Council on Global Affairs, USA. In 2021, he received the General Lamine Cissé Young Researcher Award from Partners West Africa, Senegal.

== Works ==
=== Academic publications ===
- Forces of terror: Armed banditry and insecurity in North-west Nigeria.
- Shock and awe: Military response to armed banditry and the prospects of internal security operations in Northwest Nigeria.
- Wings over flies: Air campaigns against armed banditry in north-west Nigeria.
- Contested forgiveness: Unsolicited amnesty and the reintegration of 'repentant'bandits in Northwest Nigeria.
- Phantom operators: special operations forces and asymmetric warfare in Northern Nigeria.
- Understanding Vulnerability to Violent Extremism: Evidence from Borno State, Northeastern Nigeria.
- Political economy of sub-national fragility and armed conflict in Northwest Nigeria.
- The "Webification" of Jihadism: Trends in the Use of Online Platforms, Before and After Attacks by Violent Extremists in Nigeria.
- Between "Victims" and Their "Saviors": Process-Based Leadership and Trust Building in Civil–Military Relations in Northern Nigeria.
- Political Economy of Insurgency in North East Nigeria.
- Pills, substances and brigandage: Exploring the drug factor in Nigeria's banditry crisis.
- Banditry and "captive population syndrome" in northern Nigeria.
- Displaced and Forgotten: Unveiling Northwest Nigeria's Armed Banditry Induced Humanitarian Crisis.
- Unmasking Armed Banditry in Nigeria.
- Conclusion: Making Credible Governance the Epicentre of Counter-Banditry.
- Mobility, mobilization, and counter/insurgency: the routes of terror in an African context; Insurgency, terrorism, and counterterrorism in Africa.
- Politics of "Localised Legitimacy", Vigilantism, Non-State Policing and Counter-Banditry in Northwest Nigeria: Evidence from the Epicenter.

==== Books ====
- Contemporary Security Governance in Nigeria.
- Armed Banditry in Nigeria: Evolution, Dynamics, and Trajectories.

== See also ==
- Clement Sefa-Nyarko
- Eka Ikpe
