= Montaldo Roero =

- Comune
- Comune di Montaldo Roero
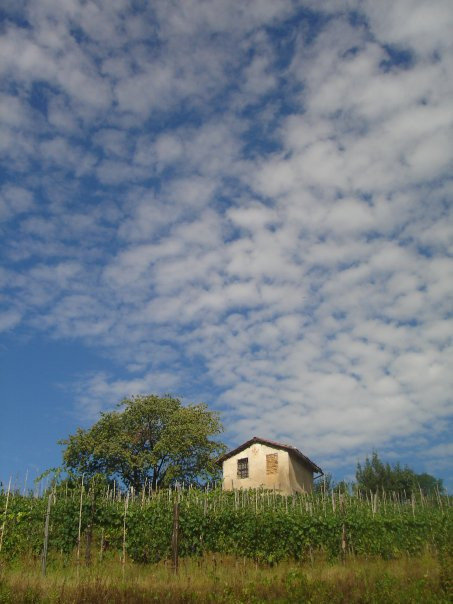

- Coat of arms

- Location within Italy Location within Piedmont
- Coordinates: 44°46′9.48″N 7°55′33.24″E
- Country: Italy
- Region: Piedmont
- Province: Cuneo (CN)

Government
  - Mayor: Michelina Coraglia

Area
  - Total: 12.0 km^{2} (4.6 sq mi)
- Elevation: 370 m (1,210 ft)

Population (31 December 2010)
  - Total: 872
  - Density: 72.7/km^{2} (188/sq mi)
- Demonym: Montaldesi
- Time zone: UTC+1 (CET)
  - Summer (DST): UTC+2 (CEST)
- Postal code: 12040
- Dialing code: 0172
- Website: Official website

Montaldo Roero is a comune (municipality) in the Province of Cuneo in the Italian region Piedmont, located about 35 kilometres (22 mi) southeast of Turin and about 50 kilometres (31 mi) northeast of Cuneo.

Montaldo Roero borders the following municipalities: Baldissero d'Alba, Ceresole Alba, Corneliano d'Alba, Monteu Roero, and Vezza d'Alba.
