= Guido Marchi =

Italian footballer

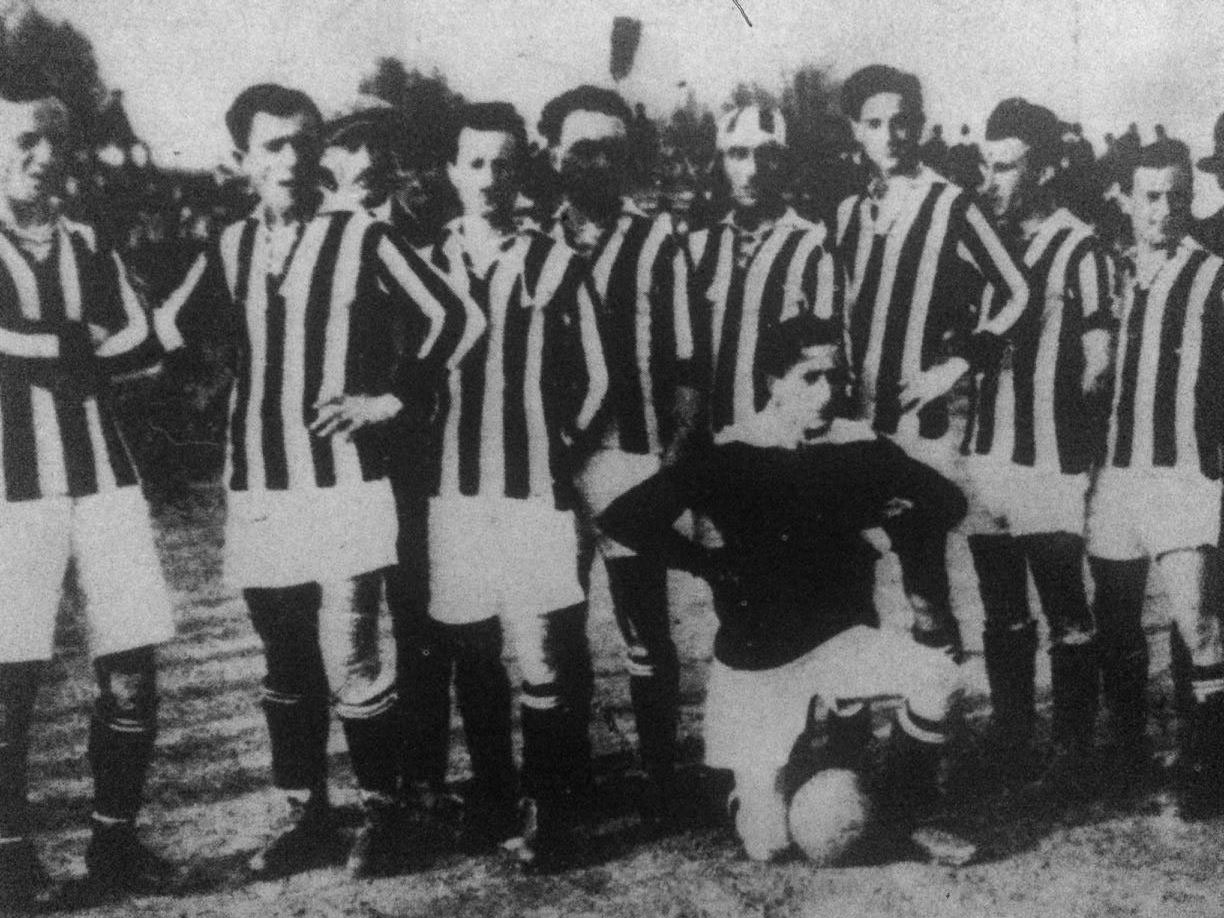
- A FBC Juventus lineup in the 1920-21 season. From the left, standing: Giuseppe Giriodi, Antonio Bruna, Guido Debernardi, Osvaldo Novo, Carlo Bigatto, Guido Marchi, Piero Gilli, Giuseppe Grabbi (plus Costa and Pio Ferraris, out of the picture); accosciato: Giuseppe Giacone.

Personal information
- Date of birth: 21 September 1896
- Place of birth: Carmagnola, Italy
- Position: Right back

Senior career*
Years	Team	Apps	(Gls)
1919–1923	Juventus	42	(2)
- * Club domestic league appearances and goals

Guido Marchi (born 21 September 1896) was an Italian professional footballer who played as a right back for Juventus. His older brother Pio was also a professional footballer.
