= Pio Marchi =

Italian footballer

Personal information
- Date of birth: 1895
- Place of birth: Carmagnola, Italy
- Date of death: December 1942 (aged 46–47)
- Position: Midfielder

Senior career*
Years	Team	Apps	(Gls)
1919–1920	Juventus	8	(2)
- * Club domestic league appearances and goals

Pio Marchi (1895 – December 1942) was an Italian professional footballer who played as a midfielder for Juventus. His younger brother Guido was also a professional footballer.
