= Diatto-Clément =

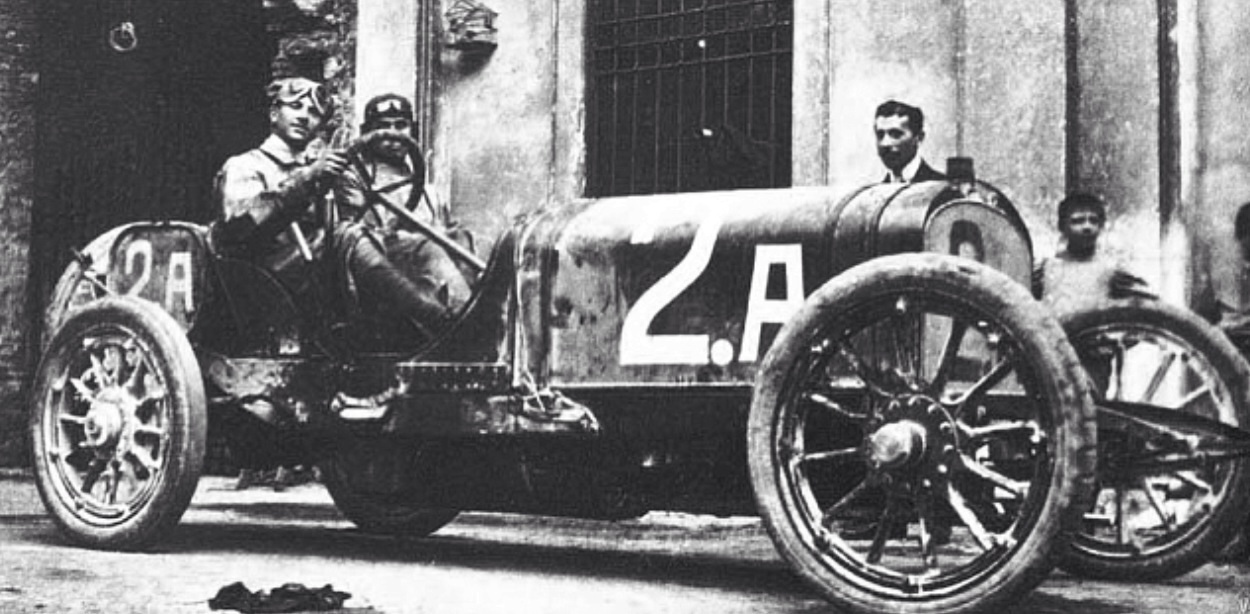
Diatto-Clément at 1907 Coppa di Velocità in Brescia, driven by Felice Buzio.

Diatto-Clément, Diatto A Clément, was a Franco Italian manufacturer of motor vehicles between 1905 and 1909. Adolphe Clément-Bayard created the 'Diatto-Clément Societa Anonima' in partnership with Diatto who had been coachbuilders in Turin since 1835.

The Diatto-Clément cars, known as Torinos, were built in Turin under licence from Clément, thus in Italy they were known as 'Diatto A Clément'. The first car was the 20-25HP which used a 3,770cc four cylinder engine. This was followed by a 10-12HP (1,884cc two-cylinder) and a 14-18HP (2,724cc four-cylinder). This series was a success and was followed by a six-cylinder model.

In 1909 Clément-Bayard left the business and the company was renamed 'Societa Fonderie Officine Frejus'.

Giovanni Gagliardi drove a Diatto Clément 10/12 hp to class victory in the Milano-Sanremo race on 4–5 April 1906. Entered in the class for 'Cars costing L. 4000 to L. 8000' it covered the 317 km in 9 hours 17 minutes 3 seconds.
