= Enrico Saroldi =

Italian sculptor

Enrico Saroldi (March 19, 1878 – 1954) was an Italian sculptor and medallist.

Saroldi was born in Carmagnola. He was primarily a monumental sculptor, and his works may be seen throughout Italy in churches and public places. Saroldi studied at the Brera in Milan under Enrico Butti, and lived and worked for the duration of his career in Milan, where he died.
