= Ceresole Alba =

- Comune
- Comune di Ceresole Alba
- Location within Italy Location within Piedmont
- Coordinates: 44°48′00″N 7°49′06″E
- Country: Italy
- Region: Piedmont
- Province: Cuneo (CN)
- Frazioni: Baracche, Borretti, Bruma, Cabasse, Cantarelli, Cantarelli dei Boschi, Cappelli, Cristini, Donati, Fornace, Madonna del Pilone, Maghini, Palermo, Pioppeto, Rava, Roggeri, Taona, Tre Vie

Government
  - Mayor: Franco Olocco (Civic list)

Area
  - Total: 37.05 km^{2} (14.31 sq mi)
- Elevation: 301 m (988 ft)

Population (1-1-2017)
  - Total: 2,072
  - Density: 55.92/km^{2} (144.8/sq mi)
- Demonym: Ceresolese(i)
- Time zone: UTC+1 (CET)
  - Summer (DST): UTC+2 (CEST)
- Postal code: 12040
- Dialing code: 0172
- Patron saint: St. John the Baptist
- Saint day: First Monday after First Sunday in September

Ceresole Alba is a comune (municipality) in the Province of Cuneo in the Piedmont region of Italy, located about 30 kilometres (19 mi) southeast of Turin and about 50 kilometres (31 mi) northeast of Cuneo.

Ceresole Alba borders the following municipalities: Baldissero d'Alba, Carmagnola, Montaldo Roero, Monteu Roero, Poirino, Pralormo, and Sommariva del Bosco.

The Battle of Ceresole was an encounter between a French army and the combined forces of Spain and the Holy Roman Empire during the Italian War of 1542–46. The lengthy engagement took place on 11 April 1544 outside the village.
