= Baldissero d'Alba =

- Comune
- Comune di Baldissero d'Alba
- Coat of arms

- Location within Italy Location within Piedmont
- Coordinates: 44°45′46.08″N 7°54′34.92″E
- Country: Italy
- Region: Piedmont
- Province: Cuneo (CN)

Government
  - Mayor: Cinzia Gotta Torre

Area
  - Total: 15.0 km^{2} (5.8 sq mi)
- Elevation: 380 m (1,250 ft)

Population (Dec. 2004)
  - Total: 1,083
  - Density: 72.2/km^{2} (187/sq mi)
- Demonym: Baldisseresi
- Time zone: UTC+1 (CET)
  - Summer (DST): UTC+2 (CEST)
- Postal code: 12040
- Dialing code: 0172
- Patron saint: St. Catherine
- Website: www.baldisserodalba.org

Baldissero d'Alba is a comune (municipality) in the Province of Cuneo in the Italian region Piedmont, located about 35 kilometres (22 mi) southeast of Turin and about 50 kilometres (31 mi) northeast of Cuneo. As of 31 December 2004, it had a population of 1,083 and an area of 15.0 square kilometres (5.8 mi^{2}).

Baldissero d'Alba borders the following municipalities: Ceresole Alba, Corneliano d'Alba, Montaldo Roero, Sommariva del Bosco, and Sommariva Perno.

== Main sights ==
- The Colonna Castlem including a frescoed Gothic chapel
- Parish Church of St. Catherine
- Church of Sant'Antonino

== Demographic evolution ==
Historical population

Year	Pop.	±%
1861	1,146	—
1871	1,231	+7.4%
1881	1,229	−0.2%
1901	1,320	+7.4%
1911	1,468	+11.2%

Year	Pop.	±%
1921	1,427	−2.8%
1931	1,404	−1.6%
1936	1,289	−8.2%
1951	1,066	−17.3%
1961	948	−11.1%

Year	Pop.	±%
1971	925	−2.4%
1981	999	+8.0%
1991	1,023	+2.4%
2001	1,084	+6.0%

Source: Data from ISTAT
