= Noemi Procopio =

Forensic scientist

- Born: Savigliano, CN
- Education: Università degli Studi di Torino University of Manchester
- Awards: 2026 Dr Richard Saferstein Award, Northeastern University, Boston 2026 Award for Achievement in the Forensic Life Sciences, American Academy of Forensic Sciences UKRI Future Leaders Fellowship, 2019-2027
- Scientific career
- Fields: Biotechnology, Forensic Science, Forensic Proteomics, Forensic Microbiology, Forensic Metabolomics
- Workplaces: University of Lancashire
- Thesis: Proteome Taphonomy, Biomolecular Investigations into the Process of Decay for Forensic and Archaeological Applications (2018)

Noemi Procopio is Professor of Forensic Sciences at the University of Lancashire, UK, originally from Sommariva del Bosco in Italy. Procopio is notable for her work in taphonomy and decomposition, in particular applying proteomics to the study of bone proteins in estimating age and time of death, including for submerged corpses. In 2019, Procopio was awarded a Future Leaders Fellowship by UK Research and Innovation, for her project Forens-OMICS: a cross disciplinary implementation of omics sciences to in vivo and post-mortem ageing investigations for forensic applications. Since 2023 she is Fellow of the American Academy of Forensic Sciences. In 2024 she has been appointed Program Chair of the American Academy of Forensic Sciences, Pathology/Biology Section, and in 2025 she has been appointed Section Secretary of the American Academy of Forensic Sciences, Pathology/Biology Section. In 2026 she has been appointed Section Chair of the American Academy of Forensic Sciences, Pathology/Biology Section. She is also the Co-Chair of the International Affairs Committee of the American Academy of Forensic Sciences since 2025.
