= Vanessa Sancho-Shimizu =

Maria Vanessa Sancho Shimizu
- Education: McGill University
- Scientific career
- Workplaces: Imperial College London; Necker–Enfants Malades Hospital
- Thesis: The genetic dissection of the host immune response to Salmonella Typhimurium infection in the wild-derived mouse MOLF/Ei (2008)

Maria Vanessa Sancho Shimizu is a UKRI Future Leaders Fellow and Reader in the sections of Paediatrics Infectious Diseases and Virology investigating the human genetic basis of life-threatening infections.

== Early life and education ==
Sancho-Shimizu completed her doctoral studies at McGill University. Her research involved human genetics, with a focus on Salmonella tryphimurium infection. She was based in the Centre for the Study of Host Resistance. She joined the Laboratory of Human Genetics at the Necker–Enfants Malades Hospital as a postdoctoral fellow, where she worked with Jean-Laurent Casanova. Here she became interested in the gene disorders that underpin Herpes simplex encephalitis. In 2012 Sancho-Shimizu joined Imperial College London as a Marie Curie Fellow, where she continued to work on herpes simplex encephalitis, and searched for other viral infections and invasive meningococcal disease.

== Research and career ==
Sancho-Shimizu was made a Medical Research Council Senior Research Fellow in 2014. She was appointed lecturer and UK Research and Innovation Future Leaders Fellow in 2021, and made associate professor in 2023.

Her research considers the genetic basis of infections. Sancho-Shimizu uncovered the genetic aetiology of herpes encephalitis in childhood, critical COVID-19 disease and invasive meningococcal disease. She studies the rare genetic variants (that can be identified by whole exome sequencing) that affect a response to interferons, the TLR signalling pathway, autophagy and pathogen recognition pathways.

To help in this endeavour and recruit patients, Sancho-Shimizu established a Biomedical Research Center Paediatric Infectious Disease Clinic at St Mary's Hospital. She developed patient cell-based assays to identify inborn immune system errors.

Sancho-Shimizu was named a UK Research and Innovation Future Leaders Fellow in 2019. During the COVID-19 pandemic Sancho-Shimizu was appointed to the International COVID Human Genetic Effort. She found that 3.5% of patients who suffered from COVID-19-induced pneumonia have genetic defects, and over 10% of people with severe COVID-19 have antibodies that attacked their own immune system.

== Select publications ==
- Qian Zhang; Paul Bastard; Zhiyong Liu; et al. (24 September 2020). "Inborn errors of type I IFN immunity in patients with life-threatening COVID-19". Science. doi:10.1126/science.abd4570. ISSN 0036-8075. PMID 32972995. Wikidata Q99710535.
- Vanessa Sancho-Shimizu; Rebeca Perez de Diego; Lazaro Lorenzo; et al. (21 November 2011). "Herpes simplex encephalitis in children with autosomal recessive and dominant TRIF deficiency". Journal of Clinical Investigation. 121 (12): 4889–4902. doi:10.1172/jci59259. ISSN 0021-9738. PMC 3226004. PMID 22105173. Wikidata Q35578631.
- Shen-Ying Zhang; Emmanuelle Jouanguy; Sophie Ugolini; et al. (1 September 2007). "TLR3 deficiency in patients with herpes simplex encephalitis". Science. 317 (5844): 1522–1527. Bibcode:2007Sci...317.1522Z. doi:10.1126/science.1139522. ISSN 0036-8075. PMID 17872438. Wikidata Q40080041.
