= Ercole Ricotti =

Italian politician and historian

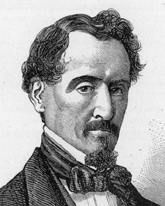

Ercole Ricotti (12 October 1816 – 24 February 1883) was an Italian politician and historian.

== Biography ==
He was born at Voghera and in 1833 he moved to Turin, where he frequented the Faculty of Engineering. In 1840 he became a member of the Academy of Sciences in Turin.

In 1846 he was appointed as professor of Military History (later renamed Modern History) in the University of Turin. He took part in the First Italian War of Independence, during which he was taken prisoner by the Austrians.

He was named to the Italian Senate from 1862 until his death. He was also Rector of the University of Turin and member of the National Council of Instruction in the Kingdom of Italy, which had been created in 1861. In 1861-1869 he published a Storia della Monarchia Piemontese ("History of the Piedmontese Monarchy"), at Florence, in six volumes. His other works includes studies on the condottieri, a Breve storia della Costituzione inglese ("Brief History of the English Constitution", 1871) and the posthumous La Rivoluzione Francese dell'anno 1789 ("The French Revolution of 1789", 1888).

He died at Turin in 1883.
