= Anna Maria Rubatto =

Italian Roman Catholic nun (1844–1904)

Saint Anna Maria Rubatto
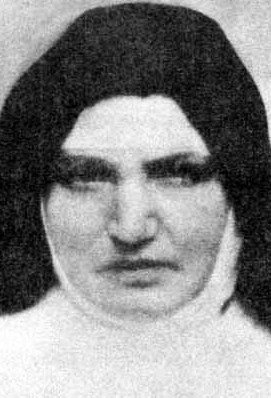

Religious
- Born: 14 February 1844; Carmagnola, Turin, Kingdom of Sardinia
- Died: 6 August 1904 (aged 60); Montevideo, Uruguay
- Venerated in: Roman Catholic Church
- Beatified: 10 October 1993, Saint Peter's Square, Vatican City by Pope John Paul II
- Canonized: 15 May 2022, Saint Peter's Square, Vatican City by Pope Francis
- Major shrine: Sanctuary Chapel of the Blessed Francesca Rubatto
- Feast: 6 August
- Attributes: Religious habit
- Patronage: Capuchin Sisters of Mother Rubatto

Anna Maria Rubatto (14 February 1844, Carmagnola – 6 August 1904, Montevideo) was an Italian Roman Catholic nun who assumed the name Maria Francesca of Jesus.

She was the founder of the Capuchin Sisters of Mother Rubatto. Most of her work was done in Uruguay where she died at the age of 59 in 1904.

Pope John Paul II beatified her on 10 October 1993 and she is considered the first Uruguayan person to be beatified. Pope Francis confirmed her canonization after approving a miracle attributed to her in early 2020; her canonization was celebrated on 15 May 2022.

== Life ==
Anna Maria Rubatto was born in Carmagnola in 1844 to Giovanni Rubatto and Catarina Pavesio as one of eight children; she lost her father at the age of four. She received a marriage offer while a teenager but turned the offer down in favor of her religious vocation. Her mother died when she was nineteen and she moved to Turin where she became a friend of noblewoman Marianna Scoffone.

Rubatto helped Scoffone with teaching catechism to children and visiting the sick and poor. Scoffone died in 1882. One morning after mass in Loano a stone fell from a construction site and struck a worker. Rubatto helped the worker and the sisters of the convent close to the incident noticed what had happened. The sisters took it as a sign that Rubatto was the person the sisters needed. She took the name of "Maria Francesca of Jesus" when she became a nun in 1885. On the orders of Bishop Filippo Allegro she became the superior of the group. This became the Capuchin Sisters of Mother Rubatto.

In 1892 she travelled to Montevideo and spread their apostolate there and in Argentina.

She contracted cancer while in Montevideo and she died in 1904 at the age of 60. She is buried in Montevideo as per her requests.

== Canonization ==
The cause for beatification commenced under Pope Paul VI on 13 April 1965 which conferred upon her the title of Servant of God. This introduction took place despite the fact that the cause had opened processes in Genoa and Montevideo that spanned from 1941 to 1970. The processes were ratified on 12 December 1975. The Positio - documentation on her life of heroic virtue - was submitted to the Congregation for the Causes of Saints in 1984.

Pope John Paul II recognized her heroic virtue and proclaimed her to be Venerable on 1 September 1988.

A miracle attributed to her intercession was investigated in Genoa in 1951 and was ratified on 12 November 1991. John Paul II approved it on 2 April 1993 and beatified her on 10 October 1993.

A second miracle needed for her canonization was discovered and an investigation was held. That process was ratified in 2013. Pope Francis approved this miracle on 21 February 2020 and Rubatto was canonized on 15 May 2022.

== See also ==
- Sanctuary Chapel of the Blessed Francesca Rubatto
- Capuchin Sisters of Mother Rubatto
