= Capuchin Sisters of Mother Rubatto =

Religious institute in Loano, Italy

The Capuchin Sisters of Mother Rubatto (Italian: Suore Cappuccine di Madre Rubatto) are a religious institute of pontificial right (acronym S.C.M.R.).

It was established at Loano on 23 January 1885. by the nun Francesca Maria Rubatto, who was later beatified by Pope John Paul II in 1993. She was canonized by Pope Francis in 2022.

== See also ==
- Sanctuary Chapel of the Blessed Francesca Rubatto

== Bibliography ==
- Annuario Pontificio per l'anno 2007, Libreria Editrice Vaticana, Vatican City 2007. ISBN 978-88-209-7908-9.
- Guerrino Pelliccia e Giancarlo Rocca (curr.), Dizionario degli Istituti di Perfezione (10 voll.), Edizioni paoline, Milan 1974–2003.
