= Fatima Akilu =

Nigerian psychologist and a public speaker

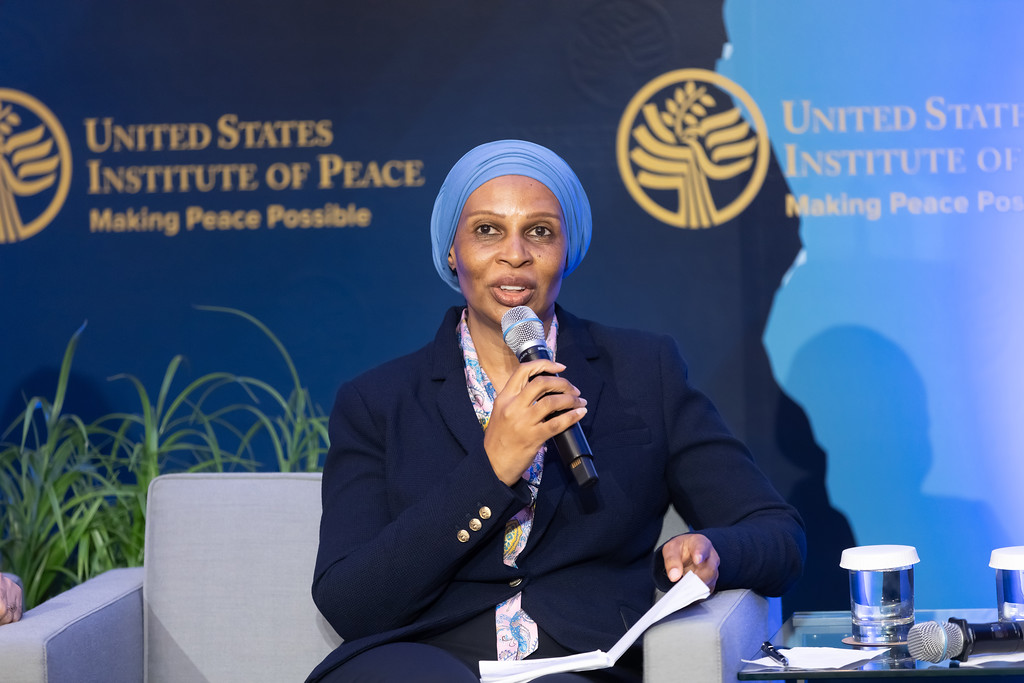
- United States Institute of Peace 2023
- Education: Beechwood Sacred Heart School; Mount St. Mary's University (Los Angeles)(BA); University of Reading (MRes and PhD)
- Occupations: Psychologist; Countering violent extremism expert Executive director of the Neem Foundation; Author; Educator
- Notable work: Counselled John Hinckley Jr, Pioneered Nigeria's CVE Programme

Fatima Akilu is a Nigerian psychologist, author, former government official, education advocate and public speaker in the areas of preventing and countering violent extremism (CVE) and counter-terrorism. She is a government representative. In 2023, she became the executive director of the Neem Foundation and the former director of Behavioural Analysis and Strategic Communication at the office of the National Security Advisor in Nigeria, where she helped develop the country's first Countering Violent Extremism Programme. Akilu is a part of the Global Strategy Network team with industry expert Richard Barrett.

Akilu writes educational children's books and is a partner of the Women's Alliance for Security Leadership. She was the host of former radio show Radio Psych, which focused on social and psychological issues.

== Early life and education ==
Akilu was born to Ali Akilu (late Secretary of the defunct Northern Region) and Hajia Astajam and she was educated at the Beechwood Sacred Heart School, Tunbridge Wells. She holds a Ph.D. and MRes in Psychology from the University of Reading and a B.A. in English and Psychology from Mount St. Mary's University (Los Angeles).

== Career ==
Akilu is an NHS-trained forensic psychologist who specializes in the treatment of offenders with developmental and psychiatric disorders. She has 20 years of experience of mental health and psychology. As a youth worker in London, Akilu counselled homeless young people, and while working at a psychiatric hospital in Washington, she counselled John Hinckley Jr, the man who attempted to assassinate Ronald Reagan.

Akilu is a university educator and an advocate for marginalized groups. Working as an adjunct professor of general psychology at SUNY Broome Community College for over 12 years, she has taught and authored several research papers relating to homelessness, ethnicity and their relationship with mental health.

Previously head of communication for the senior special assistant to the president of Millennium Development Goals, Akilu was chairman of the editorial board of a leading Nigerian newspaper. She was former director of Behavioral Analysis and Strategic Communication at the Office of the National Security Advisor in Nigeria, where she developed and worked on the country's Countering Violent Extremism Programme between 2012 and 2015. The CVE programme is part of the government's long-term strategy to tackle Boko Haram, the terror group responsible for the abduction of thousands and the deaths of over 20,000 people across Nigeria. Described as a sophisticated and research-based attempt to understand and address the causes and effects of the insurgency, Nigeria's CVE Programme is a multi-disciplinary intervention targeting ex-Boko Haram members, youth, and other vulnerable groups through social programmes that provide them with positive alternatives to violent extremism. The deradicalisation programme focuses on the nexus between development and security at the community level and aims to rehabilitate former extremists through workforce training, psychological counselling, faith-based interventions and food and health care. Akilu has worked with liberated wives of Boko Haram commanders, who pose a unique challenge since they often experienced respected and privileged positions within the insurgency society and often long to return.

In 2020, Akilu was appointed as the Visiting Senior Research Fellow at the African Leadership Centre, King's College London.

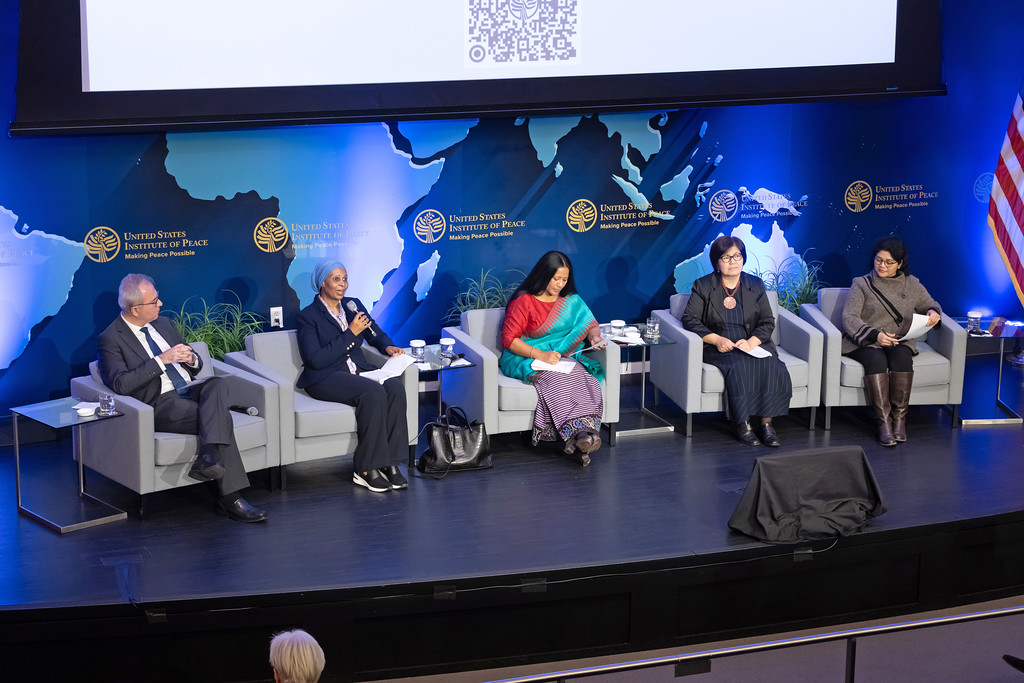
United States Institute of Peace discussion in November 2023. Sarhang Hamasaeed, Akilu speaking, Binalakshmi Nepram, Cholpon Orozobekova, Margaretha Hanita

In 2021, Akilu was a guest speaker on Doha Debates' #DearWorldLive program and shared her solution to bridging polarisation in schools: always adapting education, continually evolving curricula, access and funding for more spaces for girls and more equality within the education system.

Akilu is currently the executive director and head of the psychosocial services component of the Neem Foundation, a non-governmental organisation (NGO) founded as a direct response to the problem of insecurity in Nigeria. In 2021, Akilu said NGOs can "advise the authorities on counter-terrorism while also providing evidence that can inform related policies."

== Writing ==
Akilu has authored over 17 children's books as well as a series on the Millennium Development Goals for children to teach them about multiculturalism and worldwide development issues. She also leads a campaign to encourage Nigerian children to read 100 books each year.

== Published work ==
- Ngozi Comes to Town (Cassava Republic Press, 2008)
- Timi's Dream Comes True (Cassava Republic Press, 2008)
- Kitwa Plays the Drum (Cassava Republic Press, 2011)
- Yinka Washes His Hand (Cassava Republic Press, 2009)
- The Red Transistor Radio (Cassava Republic Press, 2009)
- The Yellow Mosquito Net (Cassava Republic Press, 2009)
- Preye and the Sea of Plastic (Cassava Republic Press, 2009)
- Aliyyah Learns a New Dance (Cassava Republic Press, 2009)
- Timi's Dream Comes True (Cassava Republic Press, 2009)
- Zahra and Coco Alphabet (Mockingbird Publishers)
- Ashraf: Flying Saucer (Mockingbird Publishers, 2011)

== Awards and recognition ==
- Zahra and Coco Alphabet, 2012 Winner of Moonbeam Children's Book Award's Gold prize in the Alphabet/ Counting Book category.
- 'Preye and the Sea of Plastics' by Fatima Akilu and 'Mayowa and the Masquerade' by Lola Shoneyin: Joint Winners for the ANA/Atiku Abubakar Prize for Children's Literature.

== See also ==
- Bisi Adeleye-Fayemi – Nigerian feminist activist, writer, and co-founder of the African Women's Development Fund
- Eka Ikpe – Nigerian development economist and Director of the African Leadership Centre at King's College London
- Toyin Ajao – Nigerian scholar and founder of Ìmọ́lẹ̀ of Afrika Centre, focused on restorative healing of intergenerational trauma
- Funmi Olonisakin – Founding Director of the African Leadership Centre and scholar of leadership and peacebuilding in Africa
