= Awino Okech =

Kenyan academic

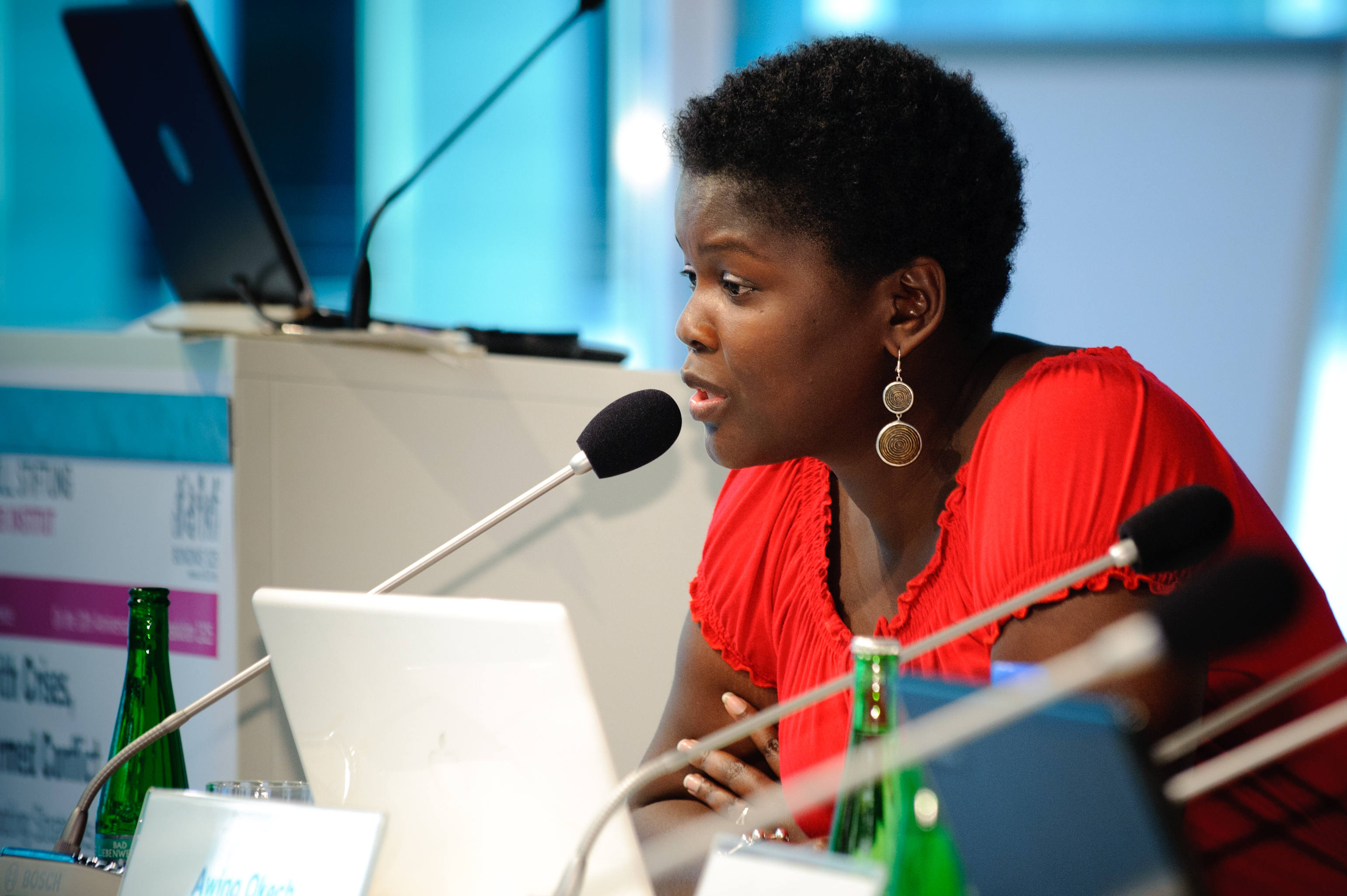
- Okech in 2010
- Born: January 1980 (age 46)
- Citizenship: Kenyan
- Education: University of Cape Town; University of Nairobi
- Occupation: Academic
- Employer: SOAS University of London
- Known for: Feminist Centre for Racial Justice
- Title: Professor of Feminist and Security Studies

Awino Okech (born January 1980) is a Kenyan academic, feminist and professor based at the University of London's School of Oriental and African Studies (SOAS). Her research and teaching intersects gender, sexuality, conflict, and security studies. She was an adjunct educator and a senior visiting fellow of African Leadership Centre, King's College London, and a member of the editorial advisory board of Feminist Africa.

== Early life and education ==
Awino Okech grew up in Kisumu, Kenya, and her mother was an educator. Okech has a bachelor's degree in political science from the University of Nairobi, Kenya, followed by a master's degree and a PhD from the African Gender Institute at the University of Cape Town.

== Career ==
Okech was a Senior Visiting Fellow at the African Leadership Centre at King's College London, where she co-convened the Gender, Leadership and Society module on the Security, Leadership and Society MSc programme.

Okech is based at SOAS, in the Department of Politics and International Studies teaching and researching the nexus between gender, sexuality, conflicts and security studies.

Okech is the founding Director of the Feminist Centre for Racial Justice at SOAS University of London, which focuses on racial justice and feminist imaginaries rooted in the majority world.

She was a member of the editorial advisory board of Feminist Africa, a peer-reviewed journal from the African Gender Institute, based at the University of Ghana. Okech was also a member of the African Security Sector Network, a pan-African scholars and policy advocates network focused on security sector reform.

In September 2023, Okech was appointed Professor of Feminist and Security Studies at SOAS University of London. She delivered her inaugural lecture titled Feminist worldmaking: On knowledge infrastructures and social transformation on 23 October 2025.

== Selected publications ==
- Awino Okech & Shereen Essof & Laura Carlsen, (2022). Movement building responses to COVID-19: lessons from the JASS mobilisation fund, Economia Politica: Journal of Analytical and Institutional Economics, Springer; Fondazione Edison, vol. 39(1), pages 249–269, April.
- Protest and Power: Gender, State and Society in Africa (Editor): Palgrave Macmillan, 2020 ISBN 9783030463427
- 'Boundary anxieties and infrastructures of violence: Somali identity in post-Westgate Kenya.' Third World Thematics: A TWQ Journal. pp. 1-17 (2018)
- Gendered security: Between ethno-nationalism and constitution making in Kenya (2013)
- Dealing with Asymmetrical Conflict: Lessons from Kenya (2015)
- Women and Security Governance in Africa, ed. Funmi Olonisakin & Awino Okech. Oxford: Pambazuka Press, 2011. ISBN 9781906387891

== See also ==
- Njoki Wamai – Kenyan political scientist and scholar of peace and security in Africa
- Bisi Adeleye-Fayemi – Nigerian feminist activist, writer, and co-founder of the African Women's Development Fund
- Eka Ikpe – Nigerian development economist and Director of the African Leadership Centre at King's College London
- Toyin Ajao – Nigerian scholar and founder of Ìmọ́lẹ̀ of Afrika Centre, focused on restorative healing of intergenerational trauma
- Funmi Olonisakin – Founding Director of the African Leadership Centre and scholar of leadership and peacebuilding in Africa
