= Bisi Adeleye-Fayemi =

Nigerian activist and writer (born 1963)

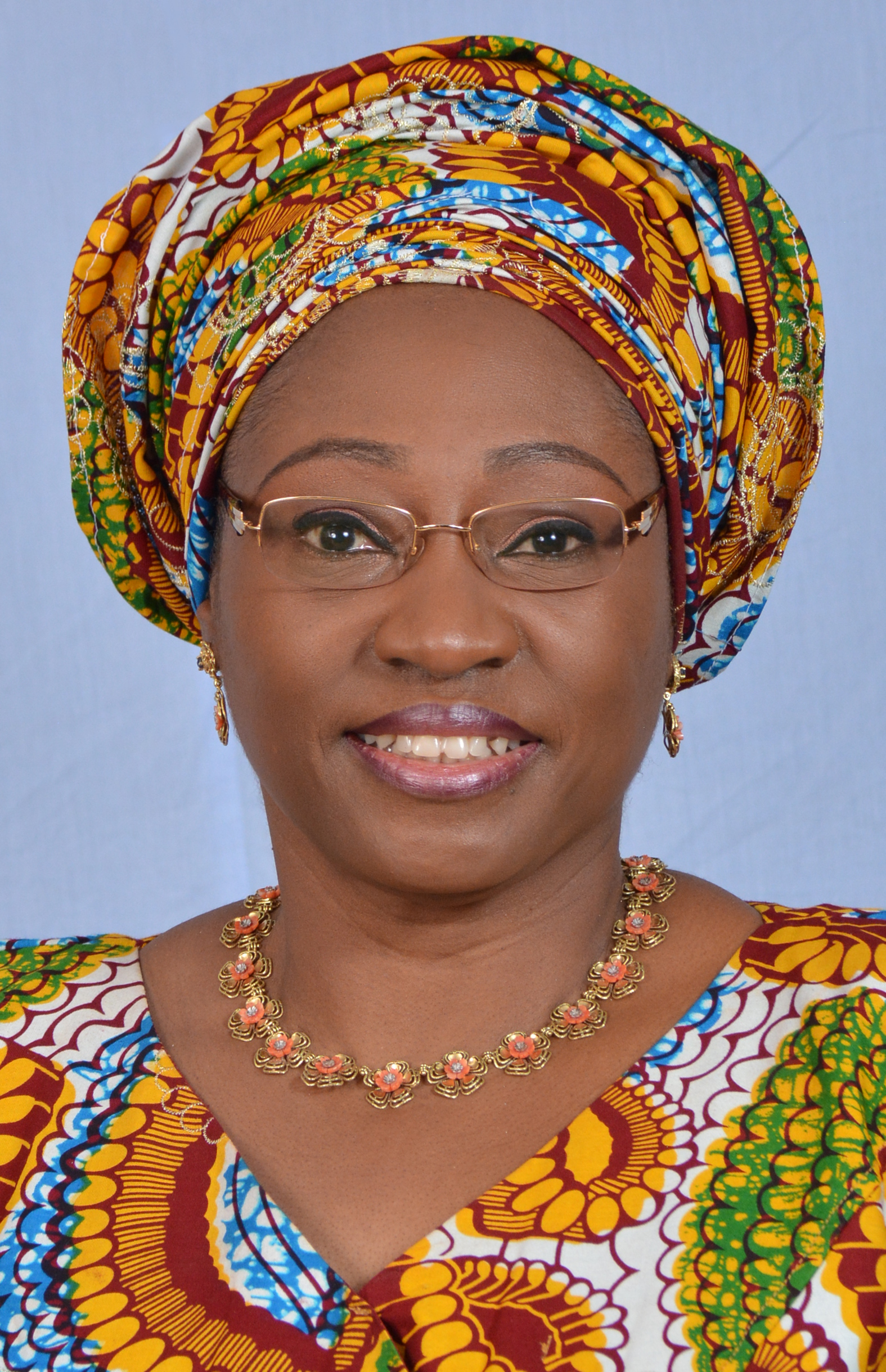
- Born: 11 June 1963 (age 63); Liverpool, England
- Citizenship: Nigeria; United Kingdom
- Education: Obafemi Awolowo University; Middlesex University
- Occupations: Feminist activist, gender specialist, policy advocate, writer
- Known for: Co-founding the African Women's Development Fund
- Notable work: Founded of Above Whispers Media Foundation
- Spouse: Kayode Fayemi (m. 1989)
- Awards: 2018 Zik Leadership Prize for humanitarian Leadership by Public Policy Research and Analysis Centre (PPRAC).

Bisi Adeleye-Fayemi (born 11 June 1963) is a Nigerian-British feminist activist, policy advocate, social change philanthropy practitioner and writer.

She was first lady of Ekiti State, Nigeria. She is the wife of Ekiti State governor Kayode Fayemi from 2010 to 2014 and from 2018 to 2022.

Fayemi is the founder of Above Whispers Media Foundation and writes a weekly column called Loud Whispers at the website Abovewhispers.com. She set up a mentoring program called The Wrapper Network. She was a UN Women Nigeria Senior advisor (2017–2018) and is a Visiting Senior Research Fellow at the African Leadership Centre, King's College London.

== Early life ==
Bisi Adeleye was born on June 11, 1963 to the family of Mr. Adeleye and his wife (nee Omitusa). Her mother is from the town of Ilara-Mokin, where her maternal grandfather, Pa Omitusa Awoseye, was a member of the royal family of Ilara-Mokin. She is a distant relative to Chief Justice Akinola Aguda through her maternal grandfather as well as a distant cousin to the current Alara, or king, of Ilara-Mokin.

== Education ==
She has a BA (1984) and MA (1988) in history from the University of Ife, now the Obafemi Awolowo University, Nigeria. She received her MA in Gender and Society (1992) from Middlesex University, UK.

== Career ==
She was the Director of Akina Mama wa Afrika (AMWA) from 1991 to 2001, it is an international organisation for African women with offices in London and Kampala. She established the African Women's Leadership Institute. She co-founded the African Women's Development Fund (AWDF), a grant-making foundation for women's organisations based in Ghana and served as the first CEO from 2001 to 2010. Bisi has served as Trustee, Comic Relief (UK) (1998–2001), co-Chair, International Network of Women's Funds (2004–2006); Honorary President, Association for Women's Rights in Development (AWID) (2003–2005); board member, Women's Funding Network (2009–2012), board member and Programs Committee Chair, [Fund for Women] (2012–2016). She is also one of the founders of the African Grantmakers Network (now African Philanthropy Network) in 2009. She was one of the conveners of the African Feminist Forum which was launched in 2006 and was a member of the Regional Working Group (2006–2016) as well as the Nigeria National Working Group.

Bisi used her platform as First Lady to influence legal and policy frameworks and to mobilise resources from a wide range of stakeholders, for the promotion and protection of the rights of women and girls.

Bisi campaigned for the Gender Based Violence Prohibition Law (GBV Law November 2011, revised in October 2019) an Equal Opportunities Bill (November 2013) a HIV Anti-Stigma Bill (April 2014), a Treatment, Care and Protection Bill for Sexually Abused Minors (June 2020), the Ekiti State Mental Health Law (October 2021) the Ekiti State Gender Composition Law (March 2022), and the Multiple Births Trust Fund (October 2022). She was Chair of the Ekiti State GBV Management Committee as well as Chair of the Ekiti State AIDS Control Agency. She was also Chair, Nigerian Governors' Wives Forum (2019–2022) and under her leadership, the NGWF became a visible and active platform for the protection of women and children. It was the NGWF that facilitated the State of Emergency against Gender Based Violence declared by the Nigeria Governors' Forum during the COVID-19 pandemic in June 2020.

She's a story writer, and an example of a story she wrote is a story of a great Yoruba heroine (Moremi Ajasoro).

== Awards and recognition ==
In December 2021, she was named as one of the 100 most influential leaders in civil society in Nigeria by National Network of NGOS in Nigeria, the umbrella body for CSOs in Nigeria. In March 2022, she was declared Outstanding Woman Leader by the United Nations Development Program Nigeria, UN Women Nigeria, the European Union delegation to Nigeria and the British High Commission. In November 2022, she was given a Lifetime Achievement Award by the African Philanthropy Network, a regional platform for African philanthropic institutions.

== Selected publications ==
Adeleye-Fayemi is the author of Speaking for Myself: Perspectives on Social, Political and Feminist activism in Africa (2013), Speaking above a Whisper(2013) an autobiography, Loud Whispers (2017), Where is your Wrapper? (2020), Demand and Supply (2023), and A Tray of Locust Beans (2023). She also co-edited Voice, Power and Soul.

- 2008 Voice, Power and Soul (co-edited with Jessica Horn)
- 2013 Speaking Above A Whisper
- 2013 Speaking For Myself
- 2017 Loud Whispers
- 2020 Where Is Your Wrapper?
- 2023 Demand and Supply
- 2023 A Tray of Locust Beans

== Personal life ==
She is married to Kayode Fayemi, who went on to become Governor of Ekiti State in 2010, and again in 2018; they met while they were students, and they have one son together, Folajimi Fayemi (born 1994).

== See also ==
- Eka Ikpe – Nigerian development economist and Director of the African Leadership Centre at King's College London
- Toyin Ajao – Nigerian scholar and founder of Ìmọ́lẹ̀ of Afrika Centre, focused on restorative healing of intergenerational trauma
- Fatima Akilu – Nigerian psychologist and director of the Neem Foundation, focused on mental health and countering violent extremism
- Funmi Olonisakin – Founding Director of the African Leadership Centre and scholar of leadership and peacebuilding in Africa
