= Black people in Cambridge =

Racial and multi-ethnic group

The history of black people in Cambridge, UK cannot easily be separated from the history of the University of Cambridge. The university has attracted students from Africa and the African diaspora to the town of Cambridge for more than two centuries. Several notable black people had a Cambridge association in the 18th and 19th centuries, and at the end of the 18th century Cambridge became a centre of abolitionist sentiment. From the end of the 19th century the university started to admit black students in larger numbers. In recent decades, however, the relatively low number of black students admitted to the university has become a topic of media comment and public concern.

The lives of Cambridge-born black people are less fully documented than those of Cambridge students. In the 2011 census 1.7% of people were Black British, and 1.0% of mixed ethnicity with black ancestry.

== Eighteenth century ==
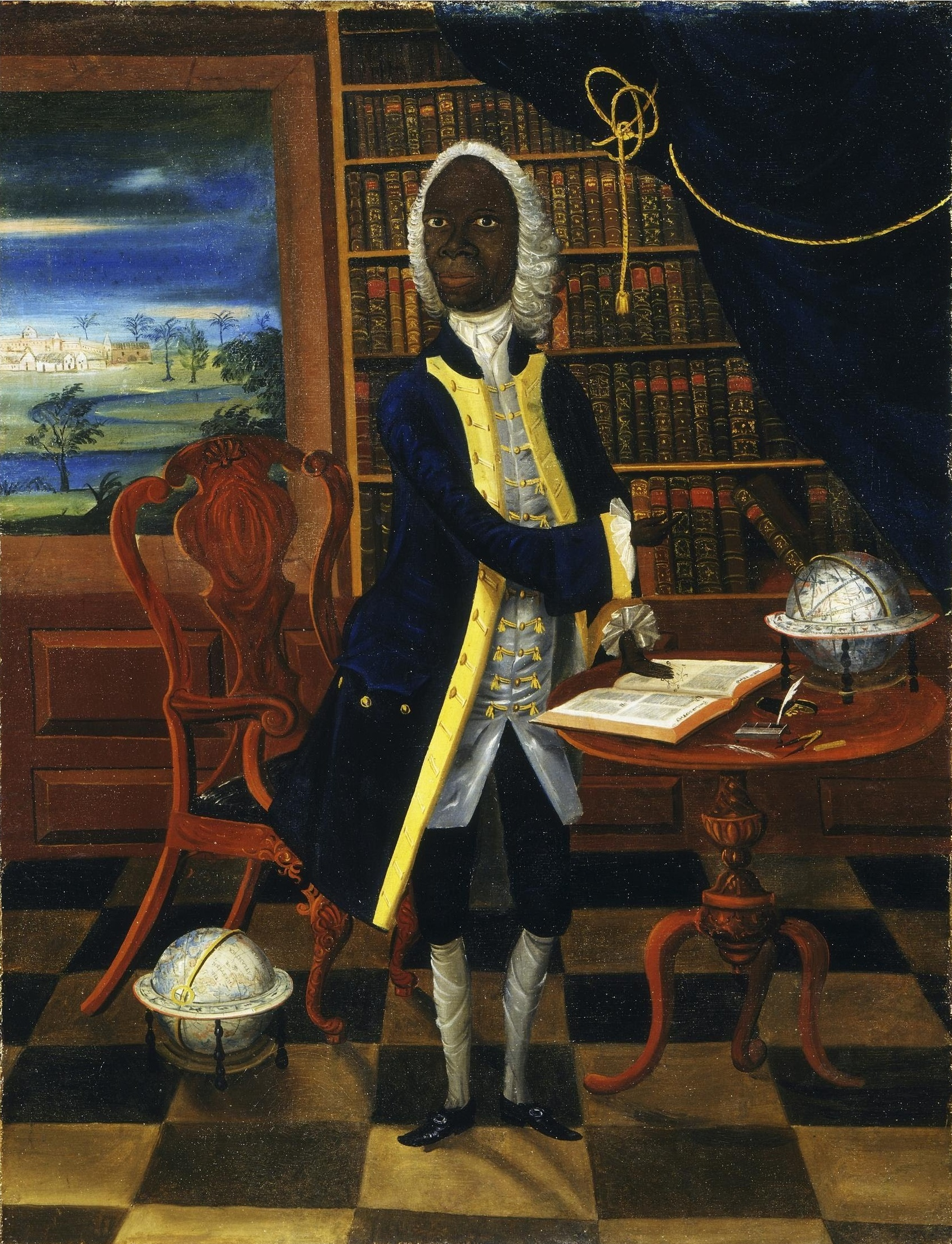
Portrait of Francis Williams, artist unknown, oil on canvas, circa 1745

The poet and scholar Francis Williams, born to a free black Jamaican couple, is the first recorded black writer in the British Empire. According to Edward Long, the Jamaican historian and apologist for slavery, Williams was educated at a grammar school and at the University of Cambridge, as an educational experiment paid for by John Montagu, 2nd Duke of Montagu. This would make Williams the first black person to study at Cambridge. However, while Williams was certainly sent to England for his education, there is no independent evidence of Montagu's financial involvement, or of Williams actually attending Cambridge.

After the 1781 Zong massacre, the Master of Magdalene College, Peter Peckard began preaching and pamphleteering against slavery. In 1782 Cambridge University Press published the Letters of the ex-slave and composer Ignatius Sancho. In 1785 Peckard set a Latin essay competition on the topic Anne liceat invitos in servitutem dare ("is it lawful to make slaves of others against their will?"). Thomas Clarkson, who had recently graduated from the university, won the competition with an anti-slavery essay which he translated and published as a pamphlet the following year.

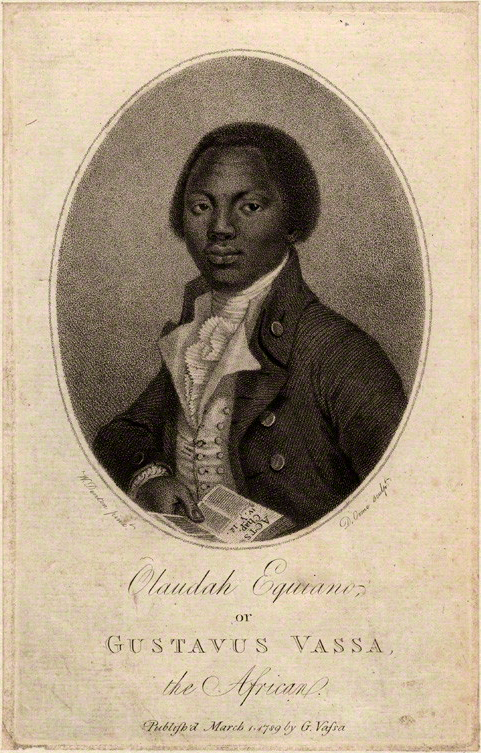
Frontispiece of The Interesting Narrative of the Life of Olaudah Equiano

In 1789, Peckard organised and led the subscription financing of the autobiography of the ex-slave and abolitionist Olaudah Equiano, also known as Gustavus Vassa. Equiano married Susanna Cullen of Soham, Cambridgeshire, and the couple set up home in Soham. Their elder daughter Anna died, aged four, in 1797, and a stone plaque in memory of her was set up outside St Andrew's Church, Chesterton:

Near this Place lies Interred
ANNA MARIA VASSA
Daughter of GUSTAVUS VASSA, the African
She died July 21, 1797
Aged 4 Years
Should simple village rhymes attract thine eye,
Stranger, as thoughtfully thou passest by,
Know that there lies beside this humble stone
A child of colour haply not thine own.
Her father born of Afric’s sun-burnt race,
Torn from his native field, ah foul disgrace:
Through various toils, at length to Britain came
Espoused, so Heaven ordain’d, an English dame,
And follow’d Christ; their hope two infants dear.
But one, a hapless orphan, slumbers here.
To bury her the village children came.
And dropp’d choice flowers, and lisp’d her early fame;
And some that lov’d her most, as if unblest,
Bedew’d with tears the white wreath on their breast;
But she is gone and dwells in that abode,
Where some of every clime shall joy in God.

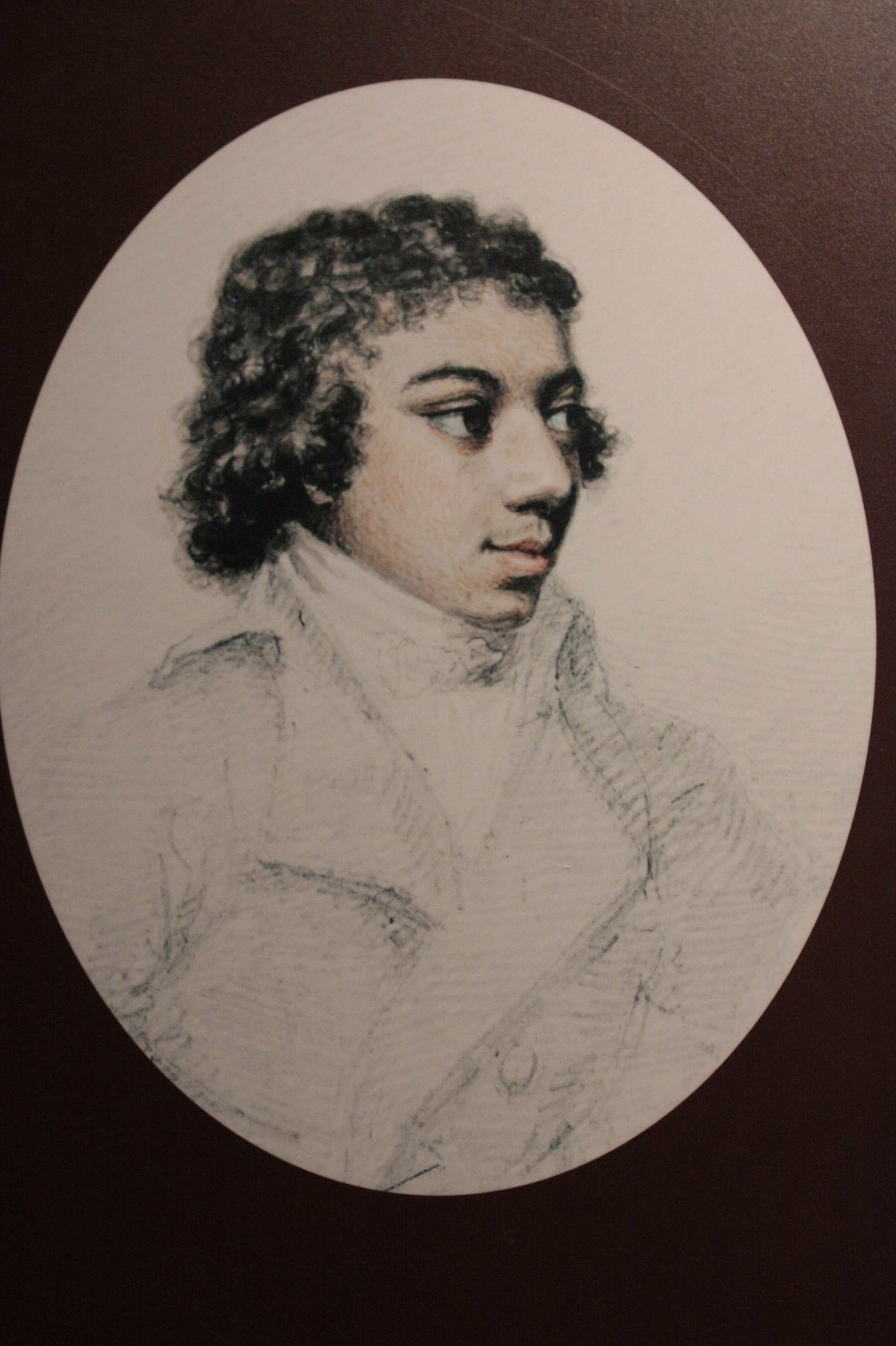
George Bridgetower, 1790

The abolitionist cause was taken up by a network of evangelical clergy and others with Cambridge connections. They included William Wilberforce, William Pitt the Younger, George Tomline, Isaac Milner, John Mortlock, Robert Robinson and Benjamin Flower. "Cambridge was one of the leading centres of abolitionist sentiment, if not perhaps the leading one." In 1808 Perronet Thompson, governor of Sierra Leone, proposed that John Thorpe and George Caulker, Sierra Leonean children whom Zachary Macaulay had brought to be educated by evangelicals at Clapham, study at Thompson's college, Queens".

== History of black students at the University of Cambridge ==
Another candidate for the first black student at the University of Cambridge is the Afro-Polish violinist George Bridgetower, who studied music at Trinity Hall and graduated a Bachelor of Music in June 1811. A composition by Bridgetower was played at Great St Mary's at the 1811 installation of the Duke of Gloucester as University Chancellor.

The first black student for whom full university records exist is Alexander Crummell, who enrolled at Queens' College in 1849 and graduated in 1853. Crummell, son of a freed slave, was an Episcopal preacher and abolitionist pamphleteer from New York City. While studying in Cambridge, Crummell hosted the abolitionist lecturer William Wells Brown, who had escaped slavery in 1834. A "minor celebrity" in Cambridge, Crummell endured a moment of racist heckling at his graduation until another student, E. W. Benson, successfully counter-heckled in his defence:

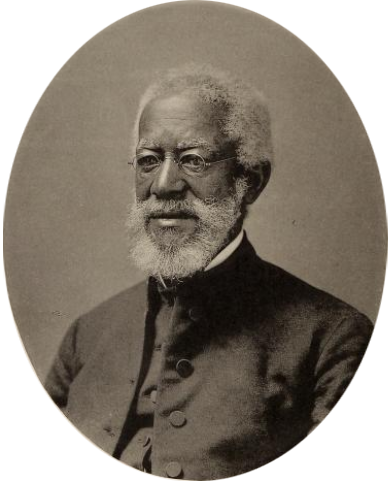
Alexander Crummell

A pale slim undergraduate [...] shouted in a voice which re-echoed through the building, "Shame, shame! Three groans for you, Sir!" and immediately afterwards, "Three cheers for Crummell!" This was taken up in all directions [...] and the original offender had to stoop down to hide himself from the storm of groans and hisses that broke out all around him.

From 1875 to 1879 George Gurney Nicol, a Sierra Leone Creole and a grandson of Samuel Adjai Crowther, studied at Corpus Christi College. The first African graduate of the University of Cambridge, Nicol was ordained and returned to West Africa. Francis Henry Fearon (1865-1906) of Sierra Leone studied law at St John's College from 1887 to 1891. Two students from the Gold Coast, the Pan-Africanist J. E. Casely Hayford and the lawyer Arthur Boi Quartey-Papafio, came to study law at Cambridge from 1893 to 1896. Both started as non-collegiate students, though Casely Hayford seems to have transferred to Peterhouse, and Quartey-Papafio joined Christ's College. Quartey-Papafio's nephew Benjamin, son of the first Ghanaian doctor Benjamin Quartey-Papafio, also started studying medicine at Downing College in 1917, though did not complete his degree.

The Nigerian-born Augustus Molade Akiwumi studied law at Fitzwilliam College from 1912. The Barbadian Ormond Adolphus Forte, later called the "dean of Cleveland Negro newspapermen", studied classics at Cambridge before World War I. The Jamaican David Clemetson started studying law at Cambridge, but enlisted in the Sportsmen's Battalions at the outbreak of World War I. In 1915 he became a British Army officer, but was killed in action in 1918. The Barbadian surgeon and pan-Africanist Cecil Belfield Clarke studied medicine at Cambridge, graduating in 1918. The Nigerian Victor Adedapo Kayode studied law at Selwyn College from 1917 to 1921. His son, the politician Remi Fani-Kayode, studied law at Downing College in the 1940s, and his grandsons, Akinola Femi-Kayode and the politician Femi Fani-Kayode, also later studied at Downing. Edmund Léon Auguste (1900–1970) from St Lucia studied medicine at Downing College from 1919 to 1922, going on to work as a doctor and medical officer in St Lucia and the Gold Coast. James Vivian Clinton from the Gold Coast, who later became a journalist in Sierra Leone and Nigeria, studied law and history at Downing from 1920 to 1923. Adetokunbo Ademola, Nigeria's first local Chief Justice, studied law at Selwyn from 1928 to 1931. The white British anthropologist Kenneth Little "had never met a person of African descent" before studying at Cambridge in the late 1930s. Proceeding to do Cardiff fieldwork for a London School of Economics PhD, he moved away from biological anthropology to focus on the sociology of race relations. What prompted the shift was his experience of the "colour bar" in Cardiff, "a slice of the reality about which my African friends in Cambridge had told me".

In 1945 Gloria Carpenter (later Cumper) became the first black woman to matriculate at the university, studying law at Girton College and gaining her LL.B. in 1946. In the late 1940s the dramatist Efua Sutherland studied teaching at Homerton College. Mutesa II of Buganda studied at Magdalene College from 1945 to 1947. Ezekiel Norukior Igho from Nigeria studied natural sciences at Downing College from 1945 to 1948 before returning to be Vice Principal of Urhobo College in Effurun.

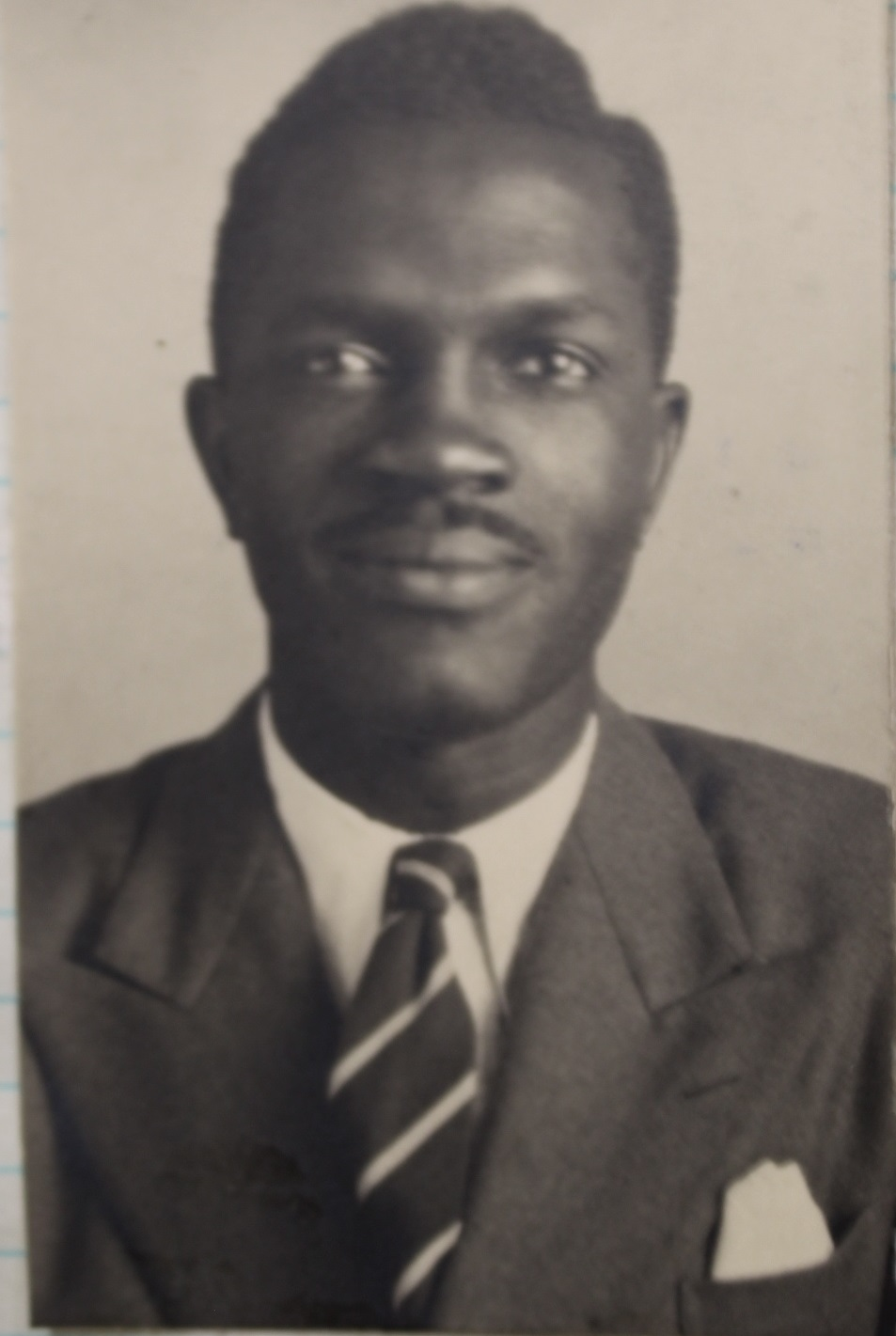
Sierra Leonean physician Davidson Nicol, who was the first Black African to attain a first-class degree at Cambridge

The Sierra Leonean physician Davidson Nicol was the first black African to gain a first-class degree at Cambridge, and in 1957 became the first black African to hold a Cambridge college fellowship. The Trinidadian politician and banker William Demas won an Island Scholarship to Emmanuel College in 1947, and stayed in Cambridge until 1955, gaining a MA in economics and a master of letters. The Guyanese-born writer and educationist E. R. Braithwaite did graduate study at Caius College, gaining a master's in physics in 1949. The Jamaican playwright Barry Reckord studied English at Emmanuel College from 1950 to 1953. The Trinidadian economist Lloyd Best studied at Cambridge in the 1950s. The African-American anthropologist James Lowell Gibbs did graduate study in Cambridge in 1953-4.

By the 1950s and 1960s, some African schools had established recurring links with Cambridge colleges: King's College, Lagos, for example, sent several students to Downing College. From 1952 to 1954 the Nigerian historian Bolanle Awe attended Perse School for Girls. The Barbadian poet Edward Kamau Brathwaite studied history at Pembroke College, graduating in 1953 and gaining a diploma in education the following year. The Kenyan scientist Thomas Odhiambo entered Queens' College in 1959 to study natural science, continuing to graduate study and gaining a PhD in insect physiology.

The Nigerian novelist Chinua Achebe was recommended by his professor at University College Ibadan, James Welch, for an exhibition to Trinity College. However, Trinity did not accept him. The Nigerian mathematician James Ezeilo, however, was accepted as a PhD student at Queens' College, and gained his PhD in 1959. The Belizean jurist and diplomat Edward A. Laing studied law at Queens' College from 1961 to 1966.

In February 1965 James Baldwin visited the Cambridge Union, to debate the motion "Has the American Dream been achieved at the expense of the American Negro" against the right-wing William F. Buckley Jr. The debate, which Baldwin won by an overwhelming majority, was televised for National Educational Television. In 1967 Duke Ellington performed a Sacred Concert at the University church, Great St Mary's. Queen Esther Marrow sang at the concert.

In the mid-1970s Cambridge University became a little nucleus of black literary activity. In 1973–4 the Nigerian playwright Wole Soyinka spent a year as visiting fellow at Churchill College. Soyinka recalls having to overcome a recurring "overwhelming desire" to smash a statue of Winston Churchill which he passed daily on the college staircase. While at Cambridge, Soyinka wrote and delivered the first reading of his play Death and the King's Horseman. The Cambridge English department did not grant Soyinka a permanent position, but permitted him to deliver classes on "Myth, Literature and the African World". His only student was Henry Louis Gates Jr., the first African American to gain a Mellon Fellowship, who had arrived in 1973 to study English literature at Clare College. Gates had befriended the British-Ghanaian cultural theorist Kwame Appiah, who had started as a philosophy undergraduate at Clare College in 1972, and Appiah had introduced Gates to Soyinka. Soyinka gave Gates a passion for African studies, and a determination to trace the lineage of African American literature to the literary traditions of Africa and the Caribbean. Pursuing this research at Cambridge meant some argument with the university faculty:

I was told in no uncertain terms that I could write about Milton or Shakespeare, maybe even Pound or Eliot, who had just recently been introduced to the canon, but certainly not anything African or African-American. And after months of arguing, they allowed me to choose as a topic the Enlightenment, the 18th century, and to look at how Europeans wrote about the first African – and what we would now call African-American – writers who were published in English and French and German and Dutch.

Other writers from the Black diaspora who studied English literature around this time were the South African writer and academic Njabulo Ndebele, who gained a MA from Churchill College in 1975, and the Guyanese writer David Dabydeen. In 1977 the Zimbabwean Tsitsi Dangarembga started studying medicine at Cambridge, but experienced racism and isolation, and did not complete her course.

In the last few decades of the twentieth century greater numbers of Black British students have studied at the University of Cambridge. The Labour politician Diane Abbott, for example, studied history at Newnham College in the early 1970s. The Conservative politician Kwasi Kwarteng studied classics and history at Trinity College in the 1990s. The novelist Helen Oyeyemi studied at Corpus Christi College from 2001 to 2004. The writer Lola Adesioye studied at Robinson College from 2001 to 2004. The Scottish rugby player Joe Ansbro studied at Robinson College from 2003 to 2006.

In 2004 Ato Quayson, who had been a graduate student at Pembroke College in the 1990s, became the first black person to achieve full tenure at Cambridge when he was appointed Reader in Commonwealth and Postcolonial Literatures.

== Black students at Cambridge University today ==
Several societies exist for black students within the university. There is the African Society of Cambridge University (ASCU). Cambridge University Ghanaian Society (CUGhS) was founded in 1990. The Cambridge University African and Caribbean Society (CUACS) was founded in 2005. In 2015 Njoki Wamai and other University of Cambridge students founded Black Cantabs Research Society as a "counter-history project". In October 2019 a Black History Month photographic exhibition, Black Cantabs: History Makers, featured portraits of black pioneers at the University of Cambridge: Francis Williams; George Bridgetower; Alexander Crummell; David Clemetson; Elizabeth Bagaaya, Batebe of the Kingdom of Toro; British civil servant Sharon White; Diane Abbott; South African anthropologist Archie Mafeje; composer Errollyn Wallen; novelist Zadie Smith; actresses Thandie Newton and Naomie Harris; writer and performer Justina Kehinde; and student Bez Adeosun.

The low number of black students at the University of Cambridge has been the focus of media attention and public concern. A CUACS photographic campaign, "Black Men of Cambridge University", went viral in 2017, highlighting that the university had only accepted fifteen black male students in 2015. Freedom of Information inquiries by MP David Lammy established that only one in four Cambridge college made offers to Black British students every year in the period 2010-15. In 2018 the grime artist Stormzy established the "Stormzy Scholarship for Black UK Students" at Cambridge. The scheme currently provides tuition costs for two students and maintenance grants for four students.

In April 2019 the university announced it was launching a two-year academic study of the ways in which the university contributed to and benefited from colonial slavery. Sixteen colleges announced their cooperation with the inquiry, and four of them announced plans to undertake their own independent inquiries.

== Black life in the town of Cambridge ==
Albert Gordon, who had come to Britain from Jamaica in 1960, became Cambridge's first black pub landlord in 1971, running the Midland Tavern in Devonshire Street with his wife Lorna. He secured a dancing license for the pub, and was "a driving force of West Indian culture for the city" throughout the 1970s. In 1980 the Cambridge Black Women's Support Group (CBWSG) was established as a house group, providing social and educational opportunities for black women and holiday playschemes for children. In 1990 the CBWSG established the Mary Seacole day nursery. Women from the group read the work of African American women writers like Alice Walker, Ntozake Shange and Audrey Lorde, and went together to see Toni Morrison when she visited Cambridge.

The anti-apartheid movement was visible in Cambridge from the 1960s onwards. On the fifth anniversary of the Sharpeville Massacre, Cambridge City Council voted to ban South African produce from its civic restaurant. In February 1969 two hundred campaigners from the Cambridge University South Africa Committee (CUSAC) marched on Trinity College in objection to the planned tour of the country by the college's drama society, the Dryden Society. Campaigners proposed renaming Kimberley road after Nelson Mandela, though residents resisted, arguing that Mandela was a communist and terrorist. However, the City Council offices in Regent Street were successfully named Mandela House. In 1985 the City Council and the Cambridge Branch of the Anti-Apartheid Movement dedicated the playground in Gwydir Street to the memory of murdered Soweto schoolboy Hector Pieterson.

Cambridge African Film Festival (CAFF) was founded in 2002. Today CAFF, held annually in October, is the longest running festival for African film in the UK. Black History Month, first held in the UK in 1987, began to be celebrated in Cambridge in 2005. The Cambridge African Network (CAN) was founded in 2008. CAN organizes events to bring together the African community in Cambridge.

In the 2011 census 1.7% (2,097 out of 123,867) of people in Cambridge reported themselves as African, Caribbean or other Black British, and 1.0% (1,198) people reported themselves as of mixed ethnicity with black ancestry. In 2011 Castle, Petersfield and King's Hedges were the Cambridge wards with the highest black population.

On 5 June 2020 several thousand people attended a Black Lives Matter demonstration on Parker's Piece in Cambridge. Black Lives Matter activists called for the removal of a 1989 stained-glass window in Gonville and Caius College commemorating the eugenicist and statistician Ronald Fisher and in June 2020, the college announced that the window would be removed because of his connection with eugenics.

== See also ==
- Black people in Oxford
- Tobias Rustat
