= Okech =

Okech is a surname. Notable people with the surname include:

- Awino Okech (born 1980), Kenyan academic and professor
