= Njoki Wamai =

Kenyan academic and peace researcher

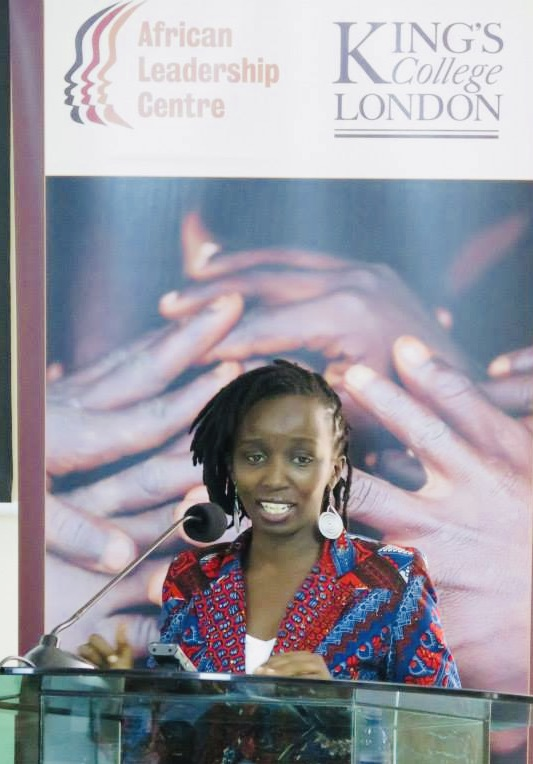
- Wamai in Nairobi, Kenya, in 2014
- Citizenship: Kenyan
- Education: University of Nairobi, King's College London, University of Cambridge
- Occupations: Academic, researcher
- Employer: United States International University Africa
- Known for: Transitional justice, African feminism, peace and security
- Title: Assistant Professor, International Relations

Njoki Wamai is a Kenyan academic, feminist activist, and Pan-Africanist whose work has focused on peace and security studies, transitional justice, and African feminisms, politics of knowledge production, and human rights intervention in Africa. She is an assistant professor in the International Relations Department at United States International University Africa (USIU-A) in Nairobi. She was awarded the Bill Gates Sr Prize for her leadership and contributions to the Gates Cambridge community in 2016.

== Education ==
Wamai earned a Bachelor of Science degree in Food Science and Technology and a Postgraduate diploma in Gender and Development from the University of Nairobi. She later completed a master's degree in Conflict, Security and Development at King's College London through the African Leadership Centre, graduating with distinction.

She received her PhD in Politics and International Studies from the University of Cambridge in 2017 as a Gates Cambridge Scholar. Following her PhD, she pursued postdoctoral research at Cambridge's Centre for Governance and Human Rights (CGHR).

== Career ==
Wamai is a Cambridge scholar and an assistant professor of International Relations at the United States International University Africa (USIU-A) in Nairobi, where she teaches and researches on human rights, African politics, and international development. Her academic work explores the relationship between international legal institutions, such as the International Criminal Court, and local transitional justice in Kenya. She has held roles in civil society organisations, including the Kenya Human Rights Commission and the Centre for Humanitarian Dialogue. She has contributed to national policy frameworks such as Kenya's National Action Plan on Women, Peace and Security.

== Affiliations and recognition ==
Wamai is a board member of the Life & Peace Institute, where she contributes to peacebuilding initiatives across Africa. She is also an alumna of the African Leadership Centre at King's College London, along with Toyin Ajao and Shuvai Busuman Nyoni.

While at the University of Cambridge, Wamai co-founded Black Cantabs Research Society, a counter-history initiative that documents the contributions of Black alumni and challenges historical erasure. Her work with the society is featured on the Black people in Cambridge page, which highlights the experiences and activism of Black students and scholars at the university. She also helped establish the Cambridge Eastern African Society and the African Society of Cambridge University. In 2024, Wamai was named one of the Top 100 Career Women in Africa by 9to5Chick, a platform that highlights professional achievements of African women across diverse sectors.

== Publications ==
- Wamai, N. (2020). "International Relations and the International Criminal Court". In Cheeseman, N., Kanyinga, K., & Lynch, G. (eds), The Oxford Handbook of Kenyan Politics. Oxford University Press. ISBN 9780198815693. Oxford University Press
- Wamai, N. (2020). "Kenya, Politics, Economy and Society in 2020". In Africa Yearbook Volume 17. Brill. doi:10.1163/9789004503182_036
- Wamai, N. (2022). "Kenya, Politics, Economy and Society in 2022". In Africa Yearbook Volume 19. Brill. doi:10.1163/9789004538115_036
- Parrin, A., Simpson, G., Altiok, A., & Wamai, N. (2022). "Youth and Transitional Justice". International Journal of Transitional Justice, 16(1), 1–18. Oxford University Press. doi:10.1093/ijtj/ijac003 Oxford Academic
- Wamai, N. (2023). "Kenya, Politics, Economy and Society in 2023". In Africa Yearbook Volume 20. Brill. doi:10.1163/9789004696976_036 Brill
- Wamai, N., & Waweru, K. (2024). "Regimes and Resistance: Kenya's Resistance History through Underground and Alternative Publications". Radical History Review, 2024(150), 233–238. doi:10.1215/01636545-11257551 Duke University Press
- Wamai, N. (2025). Review of Some of Us Are Brave: Interviews and Conversations with Sistas on Life, Art and Struggle, by Thandisizwe Chimurenga. Gender & Development, 33(1), 279–281. doi:10.1080/13552074.2025.2464475 Gender & Development

== See also ==
- Eka Ikpe
- Toyin Ajao
- Awino Okech
- Funmi Olonisakin
- Black people in Cambridge
- African Leadership Centre
