= Maxi Schoeman =

South African political scientist (1954–2025)

- Born: 29 November 1954
- Died: 14 September 2025 (aged 70)
- Citizenship: South African
- Occupations: Political scientist, Social Scientist, Academic

Academic background
- Education: Aberystwyth University

Academic work
- Discipline: International relations, Security studies, African politics
- Institutions: University of Pretoria

Maxi Schoeman (29 November 1954 – 14 September 2025) was a South African political scientist and a scholar of African international relations, peace and security studies. She held senior academic and leadership roles at the University of Pretoria and was recognised for her work on South African foreign policy, African security, feminist international relations, and peacebuilding.

== Education ==
Maxi Schoeman was born on 29 November 1954. She earned her doctorate at Aberystwyth University, Wales.

== Academic career ==
After completing her doctorate at Aberystwyth University, Schoeman returned to South Africa and joined the University of Pretoria (UP) in 2000, where she worked as a researcher and professor. From 2000 to 2019, she served as Head of the Department of Political Sciences and later as Deputy Dean of Postgraduate Studies in the Faculty of Humanities.

Schoeman's scholarship covered African peace and security, South African foreign policy, feminist approaches to international relations, African political economy, and human security. She also worked with institutions such as the African Leadership Centre, contributing to the establishment of a joint PhD awarding programme between King’s College London and the University of Pretoria. She contributed to research on the preservation and sustainability of world's oceans through her work with Institute for Security Studies (ISS). Dr. Ruth Murambadoro described her as “a great teacher of both life and practice”.

Schoeman co-edited The Texture of Dissent: Defiant Public Intellectuals in South Africa with Narnia Bohler-Muller, Vasu Reddy, Gregory Houston, and Heather Thuynsma. In African Studies Review, Alex Lichtenstein described it as a collection of 74 critical biographies of South African public intellectuals shaped by apartheid, post-apartheid inequality, and struggles for social change, while noting that the editors' definition of the “public intellectual” potentially underplays “class, gender, and other crosscutting categories of analysis.

== Death ==
Schoeman died on 14 September 2025 at the age of 70.

== Selected publications ==
- Reddy, V.; Bohler-Muller, N.; Houston, G.; Schoeman, M.; Thuynsma, H., eds. (2022). The Texture of Dissent: Defiant Public Intellectuals in South Africa. Cape Town: BestRed. ISBN 978-1-928246-57-2.
- Schoeman, M. (2010). South African Female Peacekeepers on Mission in Africa: Progress, Challenges and Policy Options for Increased Participation. Uppsala: Nordiska Afrikainstitutet.ISBN 978-91-7106-664-0.
