= Ananya Jahanara Kabir =

Indian literary scholar

Ananya Jahanara Kabir FBA
- Born: India
- Citizenship: Indian
- Education: PhD
- Alma mater: University of Calcutta University of Oxford, University of Cambridge
- Occupation: Literary scholar
- Employer(s): University of Leeds, King's College London
- Awards: Infosys Prize (2017), Humboldt Prize (2018) Fellow of the British Academy (2023)

Ananya Jahanara Kabir FBA is an Indian literary scholar. She studied literature at the University of Calcutta, University of Oxford, and University of Cambridge, and has taught at the University of Leeds and King's College London. She is the author of numerous research papers and three books. Her prizes include the Infosys Prize for humanities in 2017, and the Humboldt Prize in 2018. Kabir was elected a Fellow of the British Academy in 2023.

== Early life and education ==
Kabir completed her undergraduate studies in literature at the University of Calcutta. She pursued postgraduate studies at the University of Oxford and earned her PhD from the University of Cambridge.

== Career ==
Kabir has held academic positions at the University of Leeds and is currently a professor at King's College London, where she specialises in postcolonial studies, cultural memory, and literary theory.

== Awards and honours ==
- Fellow of the British Academy (2023) – Elected for her distinguished work in the humanities.
- Humboldt Research Award (2018) – For academic excellence and international collaboration.
- Infosys Prize for Humanities (2017) – For her contributions to literary and cultural studies.

== Personal life ==
She belongs to the Kabir lineage of Calcutta and is thereby related to Humayun Kabir and Justice Altamas Kabir among others.

== Publications ==
- Kabir, Ananya Jahanara (2023). "The Creolizing Turn and Its Archipelagic Directions". Cambridge Journal of Postcolonial Literary Inquiry. 10 (1): 90–103. doi:10.1017/pli.2022.31.
- "Africa Fashion Futures: Creative Economies, Global Networks and Local Development". Geography Compass, Vol. 15(9) (2021). Co-authored with Lauren England, Roberta Comunian, and Eka Ikpe. DOI
- Kabir, Ananya Jahanara (2013). Partition's Post-Amnesias: 1947, 1971 and Modern South Asia. Women Unlimited. ISBN 9788188965779.
- Kabir, Ananya Jahanara (2009). Territory of desire: representing the Valley of Kashmir. University of Minnesota Press. ISBN 9780816653560.
- Kabir, Ananya Jahanara; Williams, Deanne, eds. (2005). Postcolonial approaches to the European Middle Ages: translating cultures. Cambridge University Press. ISBN 0521827310.
- Kabir, Ananya Jahanara (2001). Paradise, death, and doomsday in Anglo-Saxon literature. Cambridge University Press. ISBN 0521806003.
