= Cynthia Chigwenya =

Zimbabwean African Youth Ambassador for Peace

African Youth Ambassador for Peace (AYAP) for Southern Africa
- In office February 2022 – April 2024

Personal details
- Born: Cynthia Chigwenya; 1996 (age 28–29) Kadoma, Zimbabwe
- Citizenship: Zimbabwean
- Education: M.Phil. Social Policy and Development
- Alma mater: University of Johannesburg; University of the Witwatersrand; Monash University
- Occupation: Political researcher; Diplomat
- Known for: African Youth Ambassador for Peace

Cynthia Chigwenya (born 1996) is a Zimbabwean political researcher and pracademic, whose work explores youth participation in peacebuilding, security sector governance, and social policy. She served as one of five regional ambassadors appointed by the African Union as African Youth Ambassador for Peace (AYAP) for Southern Africa, under the Political Affairs, Peace and Security (PAPS) division, from February 2022 to April 2024.

== Background and education ==
Cynthia Chigwenya was born in Kadoma, Zimbabwe, in 1996, and grew up in Bulawayo.

She holds a Bachelor of Social Sciences (B.Soc.Sci) in Criminology and International Studies from Monash University, and a Bachelor of Arts (B.A) Honours in Development Studies, summa cum laude, from the University of Johannesburg. She also earned a Master of Arts (M.A) in Development Studies from the University of the Witwatersrand (2020–2022) and a Master of Philosophy (M.Phil.) in Social Policy and Development, with distinction, from the University of Johannesburg.

She was a Konrad-Adenauer-Stiftung Scholar affiliated with the University of the Witwatersrand and the South African Institute of International Affairs (SAIIA) In 2021.

Chigwenya was named Most Influential Persons of African Descent (MIPAD) Global 100 under 40 Honoree, United Nations-affiliated 2022.

== Career ==
Cynthia Chigwenya began her career in 2018 as a Graduate Researcher for the National Commission For The Fight Against Genocide in Kigali, Rwanda, and contributed to the United Nations Convention on the Prevention of Genocides report. From 2020 to 2021, she was a Research Scholar for the South African Institute of International Affairs (SAIIA), where she worked with the South African Parliament.

In 2019, Chigwenya gave her debut TEDx presentation at TED Lyttleton Women in South Africa.

In 2022, she was appointed African Union’s Youth Ambassador for Southern Africa to represent youth peacebuilders In this role, she engaged government ministries, advocating for National Action Plans (NAPs) on Youth, Peace and Security (YPS).

In 2023, Chigwenya facilitated youth consultations in Burundi, which led to the endorsement and adoption of the Bujumbura Declaration on Youth, Peace and Security in Africa by AU member-states. That same year, she was invited to brief the United Nations Security Council (UNSC) at its 9315th meeting on Futureproofing Trust for Sustaining Peace, speaking alongside Professor Funmi Olonisakin and UN High Commissioner Volker Türk.

Chigwenya is a programme coordinator for Political Dialogue in Sub-Saharan Africa at the Konrad-Adenauer-Stiftung.

== Publications ==
- Chigwenya, C. (2023). Building Peace through the Cracks: Analysing Youth Participation in Formal Peacebuilding in Africa (Report). Africa Center for Strategic Studies (ACSS), National Defense University.
- Chigwenya, C. (3 May 2023). "Futureproofing Trust for Sustaining Peace". UN Web TV. Security Council Report, United Nations. p. 5 of 5.
- Shipalana, P.; Chigwenya, C. (2020). The Impact of COVID-19 on Green Development (Report). South African Institute of International Affairs (SAIIA).
- Chigwenya, C. (16 June 2020). "Post-Conflict Identity". TEDx Talk.

== See also ==
- Funmi Olonisakin
- Ruth Murambadoro
- Transitional justice
- Peacebuilding
- African Union
