= Naminata Diabate =

Ivorian academic and professor

- Education: Université de Cocody; University of Texas at Austin
- Occupations: Scholar, professor
- Employer: Cornell University
- Known for: African feminist theory, protest studies
- Notable work: Naked Agency: Genital Cursing and Biopolitics in Africa

Naminata Diabate is an Ivorian scholar, author, and Associate professor of Comparative literature at Cornell University. She is the author of Naked Agency: Genital Cursing and Biopolitics in Africa.

== Education ==
Diabate earned her undergraduate degree from the Université de Cocody in Abidjan, Ivory Coast. She received her M.A. (2006) and Ph.D. (2011) in Comparative Literature at the University of Texas at Austin, with concentrations in African Diaspora Studies and Women’s and Gender Studies.

== Academic career ==
Diabate is an associate professor at Cornell University. She held the Robert and Helen Appel Fellowship for Humanists and Social Scientists at Cornell in 2020, for academic excellence. Diabate is also a member of the Advisory Board of the Africa Institute in Sharjah, UAE, and served as an Ali A. Mazrui Senior Fellow from 2021 to 2023. In 2024, Diabate was named one of the "10 African Scholars to Watch" by The Africa Report, alongside Simukai Chigudu, Toyin Ajao and Satang Nabaneh.

== Naked Agency ==
Naked Agency: Genital Cursing and Biopolitics in Africa examines the use of insurrectional nudity and genital cursing as forms of political protest and embodied resistance in African contexts. The book has been cited as a significant contribution to African feminist scholarship and biopolitical studies, offering new frameworks for understanding protest, embodiment, and power. Ololade Faniyi's review in Feminist Africa highlights how the book challenges simplistic, overly romanticised narratives of African women's defiant disrobing as purely empowering or victimising.

== Awards ==
- African Studies Association (ASA), Best Book Prize, 2021.
- African Literature Association (ALA), First Book Award 2022.

== Selected publications ==
- Naked Agency: Genital Cursing and Biopolitics in Africa (Duke University Press, 2020). ISBN 9781478006886
- "Jean Pierre Bekolo’s Les Saignantes and the Mevoungou: Ambivalence towards the African Woman’s Body". In Women, Gender, and Sexualities in Africa, edited by Toyin Falola and Nana Akua Amponsah, pp. 21–39. Durham, NC: Carolina Academic Press, 2013. ISBN 9781611631531.
- "Genital Power: Female Sexuality in West African Literature and Film". Research in African Literatures, Vol. 42, No. 4 (2011): 72–93.
- "From Women Loving Women in Africa to Jean Genet and Race: A Conversation with Frieda Ekotto". Journal of the African Literature Association, Vol. 4, No. 1 (2010): 181–203.

== See also ==
- Simukai Chigudu
- Siphokazi Magadla
- Satang Nabaneh
