= Zeedah Meierhofer-Mangeli =

Kenyan-Swiss social anthropologist and feminist activist

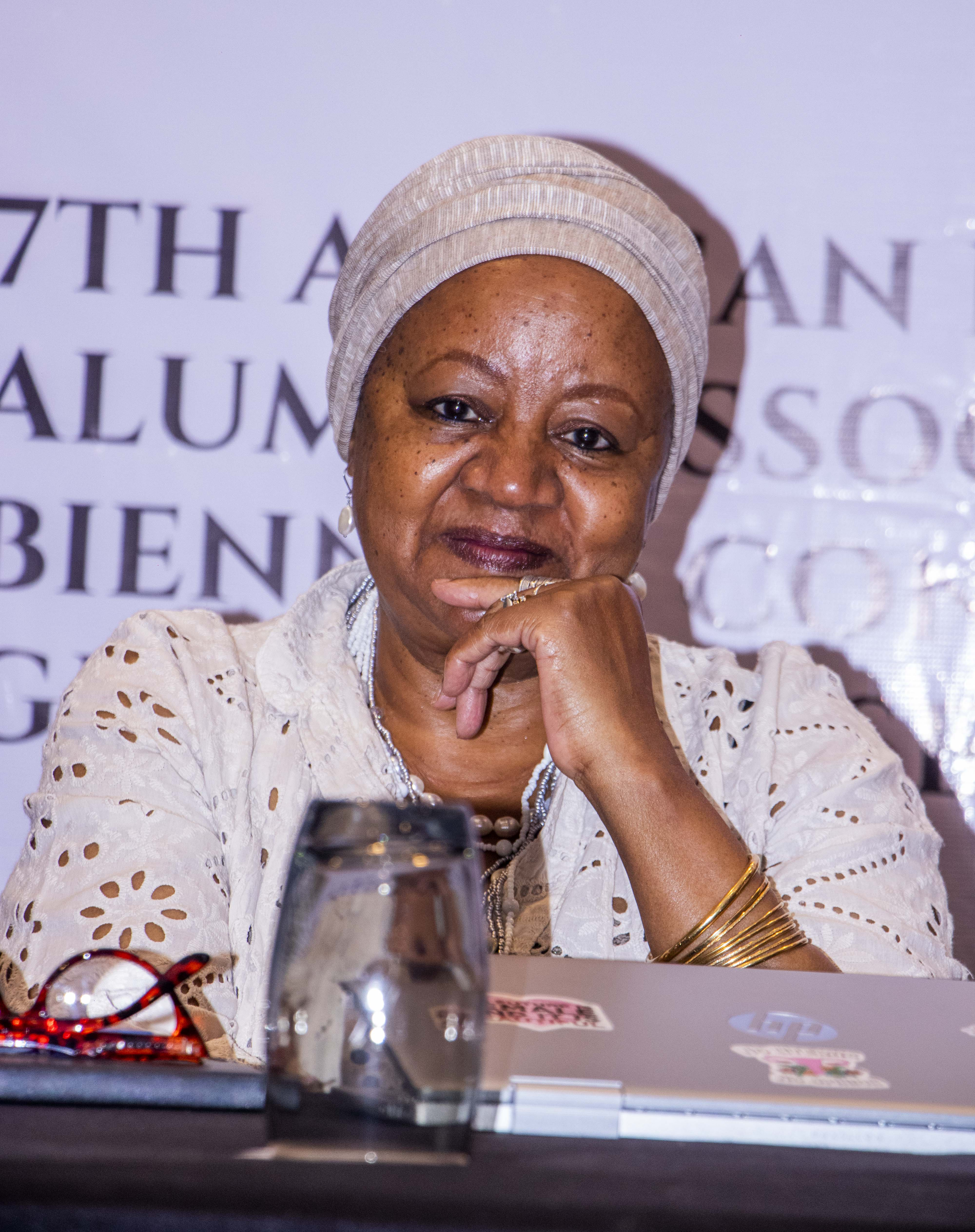
- Meierhofer-Mangeli in Abuja, 2025
- Born: Zeedah Mutheu Doris; October 1957 (age 68); Kenya
- Citizenship: Kenya-Swiss
- Education: BA in Sociology and Pedagogy; MA in Resolution and Conflict Management
- Occupations: Social anthropologist, educator, feminist activist

Zeedah Meierhofer-Mangeli (born October 1957) is a Kenyan-Swiss social anthropologist, educator, social justice, and feminist activist. She is the co-founder of the Zurich Meeting Point for Black Women (Treffpunkt Schwarze Frauen), and established the Resource Center for Women and Girls Trust, Kenya. In 2023, the City of Zurich awarded her the Züri Taler (Stadttaler) in recognition of her work on anti-racism, gender equality, and social justice through Meeting Point for Black Women.

== Background ==
Meierhofer-Mangeli was born in Kenya in 1957 and moved to Zurich, Switzerland, in 1979 as a student. Growing up, Meierhofer-Mangeli was influenced by her widowed mother, who rejected traditional societal expectations and emphasised the values of self-determination, independence, and autonomy. Following her migration from Kenya to Switzerland in the late 1970s, Meierhofer-Mangeli experienced systemic exclusion and racial discrimination, which led her co-founding the Meeting Point for Black Women (Treffpunkt Schwarze Frauen) to provide counselling, community support, and anti-racism advocacy. She cited her experiences of racism and exclusion affecting her daughters, and Audre Lorde's visits to Zurich in the 1980s, as catalysts for bringing Black women together.

== Education ==
Meierhofer-Mangeli holds a Bachelor of Arts in sociology and pedagogy, and a Master of Arts in conflict resolution and management.

== Activism and career ==
Meierhofer-Mangeli co-founded the Meeting Point for Black Women (Treffpunkt Schwarze Frauen) in Zurich in 1993, and led the centre till 2010, supporting Black women to collectively navigate racial discrimination, social exclusion, and migration-related challenges in Switzerland. The centre became an important organising and support system for Black women and migrant communities and received the Municipal Equality Award in 1997.

Meierhofer-Mangeli was the first Black woman to join a Swiss political party and run for public office. She joined the Social Party of Switzerland and contested Parliament. Through her career, she led the youth awareness and civics training for Focus World in Switzerland, co-directed the Zurich Women's Shelter for Abused Women and Children, and contributed to concept development and training for the Swiss police on domestic violence.

Meierhofer-Mangeli served as Akina Mama wa Afrika (London and Uganda)'s director. In 2007, she founded the Resource Center for Women and Girls Trust, an organisation focused on leadership development, education, and support for adolescent girls and young women from rural and marginalised communities in Machakos, Kenya. In 2019, the Center received the With and For Girls Award for its grassroots programmes on mentorship, education, and leadership development for girls and young women in Kenya.

Meierhofer-Mangeli is a trustee of the African Leadership Centre (ALC). She participated in the 1995 World Conference on Women in Beijing, joining the landmark event to contribute to global efforts for gender equality. Photography is one of her hobbies and has been instrumental in documenting the lives and profiles of African women. Her photographs have been exhibited in Switzerland, Uganda, the United Kingdom, and at the United Nations in New York City.

== Awards and recognition ==
- In 1997, the Meeting Point for Black Women received the Municipal Equality Award in Zurich.
- In 2019, the Resource Center for Women and Girls Trust received the With and For Girls Award for its grassroots programmes on mentorship, education, and leadership development for girls and young women in Kenya.
- In 2023, the City of Zurich awarded Meierhofer-Mangeli the Züri Taler in recognition of her pioneering work and collaborations promoting inclusion, diversity, and social justice.

== Personal life ==
Meierhofer-Mangeli holds dual Kenyan and Swiss citizenship and divides her time between London, Zurich, and Nairobi. Meierhofer-Mangeli is married to a Swiss national, with whom she has two daughters.
