= Beechwood School, Royal Tunbridge Wells =

Beechwood School
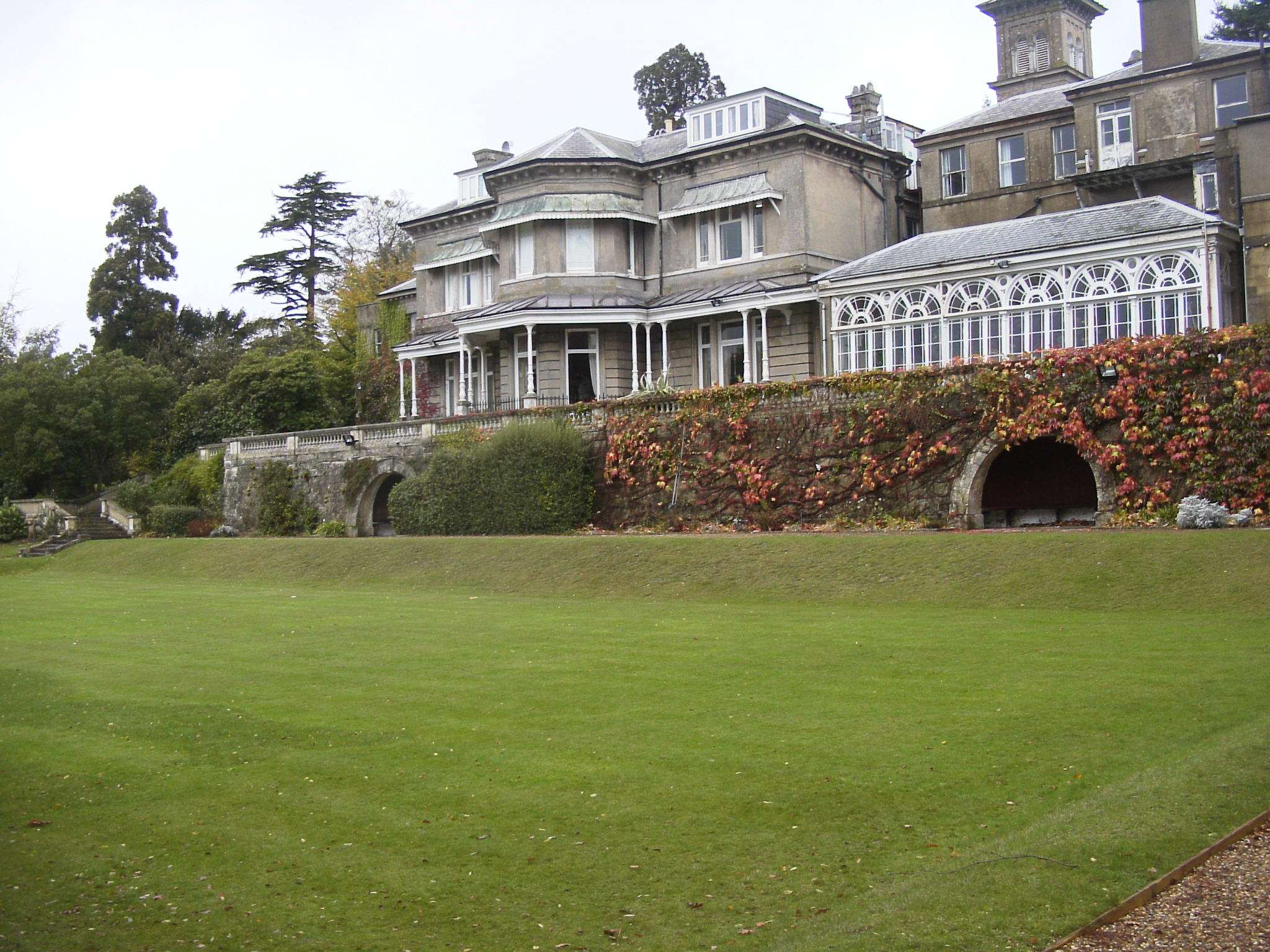

Location
- Pembury Road; Tunbridge Wells, Kent, TN2 3QD; England
- Coordinates: 51.13593°N 0.28689°E

Information
- Type: Private day and boarding
- Established: 1915
- Local authority: Kent
- Department for Education URN: 118949 Tables
- Headmistress: Dani Saffer
- Gender: Co-educational
- Age: 3 to 18
- Enrolment: 300
- Houses: Hever, Scotney, Bodium
- Website: http://www.beechwood.org.uk

Beechwood School is a co-educational independent day and boarding school for children aged 3–18, which comprises a nursery, preparatory school and senior school, with boarding for children aged 11–18. Beechwood is situated on a 23-acre campus in Tunbridge Wells, Kent. Admission to the senior school is via assessment in mathematics, English, non-verbal reasoning, and creative writing. Ages of admission are at 11+, 13+ and 16+. The school serves the local area in West Kent and East Sussex, but welcomes boarders from many different nations.

== History ==
The origins of Beechwood House date back to 1855, located on Calverley Mile Road (now Pembury Road) amid a number of other Italian style Victorian villas of the time. The school celebrated its centenary in 2015. This was marked by alumni events and the collation of artifacts for a time capsule to be opened in 2065. Founded by the Society of the Sacred Heart in 1915, Beechwood retains its founders' traditions but today welcomes pupils of all faiths.

Beechwood's headmistress is Ms Dani Saffer.

== Notable former pupils ==
- Fatima Akilu, Nigerian psychologist and author
- Deirdre Clancy, costume designer
- Julia Cumberlege, Baroness Cumberlege (nee Camm), politician
- Miatta Fahnbulleh, MP and economist
- Pauline Gower, aviator
- Louise Mensch, author and former MP
- Libby Purves, journalist
