= Simukai Chigudu =

Zimbabwean scholar of African politics (born 1986)

- Born: 1986 (age 39–40); Zimbabwe
- Education: St George's College, Harare; Stonyhurst College; Newcastle University; University of Oxford
- Awards: African Studies Association Audrey Richards Prize
- Scientific career
- Workplaces: Imperial College London; University of Oxford
- Thesis: "State of emergency": the politics of Zimbabwe's cholera outbreak, 2008/09 (2017)

Simukai Chigudu (born 1986) is an Associate Professor of African Politics at the University of Oxford. His work considers the social and political mechanisms that give rise to inequality in Africa.

== Early life and education ==
Chigudu was born in Zimbabwe, where he attended St George's College, Harare. In 2003 he moved to the United Kingdom, where he attended private boarding school Stonyhurst College, going on to study medicine at Newcastle University.

After graduating, he worked as a doctor in the National Health Service, and became increasingly interested in global health and healthcare equity. He took part in several international placements, including at the Global Fund for Women where he studied sexual health in Sub-Saharan Africa. As part of this position Chigudu worked in rural hospitals in South Africa and was a research assistant a large epidemiological survey in Tanzania. On his return he joined Imperial College London as an academic clinical fellow in public health. During his fellowship he earned a Master's in Public Health where he studied the health system in The Gambia. To further his interest in social sciences, Chigudu decided to complete a second master's degree, and moved to the University of Oxford to train in African studies. He was awarded a Weidenfeld-Hoffmann Scholarship to investigate feminist movements in Northern Uganda. While at Oxford he decided to work toward a PhD in the Oxford Department of International Development under the supervision of Jocelyn Alexander. As a graduate student, Chigudu was a founding member of the Oxford Rhodes Must Fall activist group that looked to "decolonise" both Oxford and academia more broadly. He was awarded the African Studies Association Audrey Richards Prize for the best doctoral thesis in African Studies in the United Kingdom.

In 2024, The Africa Report included Chigudu in its list of African scholars to watch in 2024, along with Naminata Diabate, Toyin Ajao and Satang Nabaneh.

== Research and career ==
He has investigated the social and political origins and impacts of the 2008 Zimbabwean cholera outbreak. He attributes the spread of this preventable disease to a breakdown of public health infrastructure and diminishing bureaucratic order. Throughout the COVID-19 pandemic, Chigudu became concerned by how Africa would respond to the outbreak of coronavirus disease.

During the George Floyd protests in the UK, Chigudu wrote an article in the Guardian reflecting on the Rhodes Must Fall movement and how it had changed in the wake of the protests. At one of the 2020 Black Lives Matter protests in Oxford, Chigudu stated: "The [University of Oxford] is structured according to a legacy and a culture that is very white and very elitist." Due to his work concerning the legacy of colonialism, Chigudu has been invited to speak at the University College London, the University of Edinburgh and the School of Oriental and African Studies.

== Selected publications ==
- Chigudu, Simukai (2020). The Political Life of an Epidemic: Cholera, Crisis and Citizenship in Zimbabwe. Cambridge: Cambridge University Press. doi:10.1017/9781108773928. ISBN 978-1-108-48910-2. S2CID 243715543.
- Chigudu, Simukai; Jasseh, Momodou; d'Alessandro, Umberto; Corrah, Tumani; Demba, Adama; Balen, Julie (2014-09-22). "The role of leadership in people-centred health systems: a sub-national study in The Gambia". Health Policy and Planning. 33 (1): e14–e25. doi:10.1093/heapol/czu078. ISSN 0268-1080. PMID 29304251. S2CID 19057497.
