= African Leadership Centre =

Research institution at King's College London

- Established: June 24, 2010
- Founder: Funmi Olonisakin
- Parent institution: King's College London
- Affiliations: University of Nairobi
- Director: Eka Ikpe, London; Shuvai Busuman Nyoni, Nairobi
- Location: London and Nairobi
- Website: ALC website

The African Leadership Centre (ALC) is a research and academic institution focused on leadership development, peacebuilding, and security studies in Africa. It operates as a partnership between King's College London and the University of Nairobi. The Centre was officially launched on 24 June 2010 in Nairobi, Kenya, as part of an initiative to mentor the next generation of African leaders, scholars and practitioners.

The ALC was founded by Professor Funmi Olonisakin of King’s College London, who also served as its first director. The Centre has offices in London and Nairobi and works to advance African-led approaches to peace, security, and leadership.

== History ==
The African Leadership Centre (ALC) was officially launched on 24 June 2010 in Nairobi, Kenya, as part of a pioneering initiative to cultivate a new generation of African leaders and scholars. The Centre was founded by Professor Funmi Olonisakin of King's College London, who also served as its first director.

Conceived as a partnership between King's College London and the University of Nairobi, the ALC was designed to generate cutting-edge research on peace, security, and development in Africa while mentoring young leaders. Its mission emphasizes personal transformation for African scholars who will, in turn, drive change in their communities.

The Centre was formally established under Kenyan law as an educational trust, to operates as a continental research hub in partnership with King's College London and the University of Nairobi, focusing on scholarship and mentorship excellence to transform Africa. The Nairobi centre is currently led by Shuvai Busuman Nyoni, who serves as Executive Director, while the London-based centre is directed by Eka Ikpe, Professor of Development Economics in Africa at King’s College London.

== Programmes ==
The Centre offers leadership development initiatives for emerging women leaders and professionals, alongside academic pathways such as fellowships, master’s degrees, and doctoral studies in leadership, peace, security, and development while supporting postdoctoral research and leadership training pathways.

ALC is part of the School of Global Affairs within the Faculty of Social Science & Public Policy at King's College London. It maintains collaborations with universities, think tanks, and international organisations, such as International Peace Institute, where fellows visit each July for academic mentorship.

Each year, the Centre organises Africa Week, a programme of academic and public events showcasing research and outreach activities related to African peace, security, and development.

ALC holds annually, the Peter da Costa Memorial Lecture Series to honour the legacy of the late Dr Peter da Costa, former vice-chair of the ALC Board of Trustees, who died in 2019.

The Centre also operated a Datalab to conduct research and generate knowledge on peace, security, and development topics using data‑mining techniques.

== Continental impact ==
The ALC established the African Public Square (APS) in 2023 as a continental platform to harness Africa’s intellectual power and intergenerational agency. The APS was officially launched in Nairobi, Kenya, on 27 June 2024. Shortly afterwards, the first post‑launch continental edition was held in London during King’s Africa Week on 3 March 2025, hosted at Bush House, Strand Campus, in collaboration with ALC.

The APS was designed to provide a convening space for new and established African public intellectuals to engage in open debate on peace, security, development, and Africa’s position in a changing global order. Through the APS, the ALC seeks to “speak back to established agendas in the global landscape that place Africa at a disadvantage,” offering new frameworks and proposals for Africa’s renewal.

The platform’s significance has been highlighted in independent media, including Mount Kenya Times, which described APS as ushering in a new era for Africa’s intellectual and strategic renaissance, and News Ghana, which reported on the second continental edition held in Abuja as part of ECOWAS’ 50th anniversary celebrations.

The Centre also runs an ALCRadio, a pan‑African public‑interest radio initiative that engages diverse audiences across Africa and the Diaspora on issues of peace, security and leadership.

== Legacy and alumni ==
The African Leadership Centre promotes an intergenerational approach to leadership development through initiatives such as the Practice of Leadership Programme, which pairs fellows and alumni with senior African practitioners for mentoring and knowledge exchange.

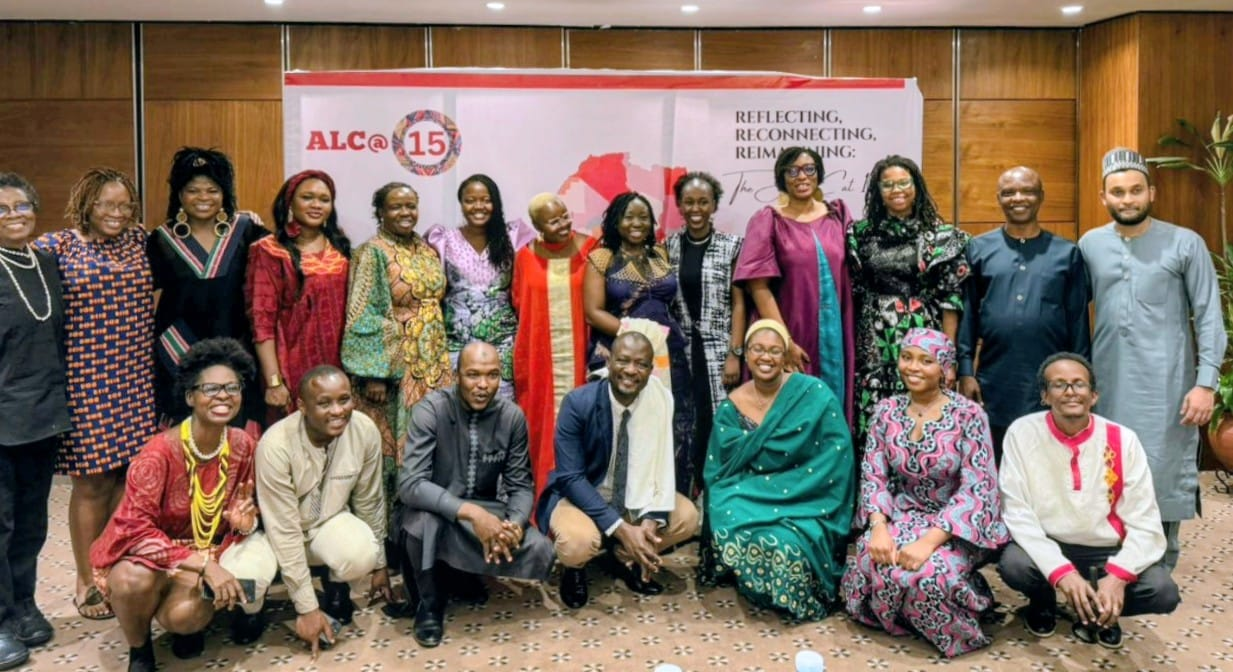
African Leadership Centre alumni with Professor Funmi Olonisakin in Abuja on November 1st 2025.

A notable example is Shuvai Busuman Nyoni, who became the first alumna to serve as Executive Director after completing the Peace and Security Fellowship for African Women in 2009–2010. She previously coordinated the ALC Alumni Network.

The Alumni Association brings together former fellows who convene biennially for conferences. The 7th Alumni Conference, held in Abuja in 2025, coincided with ALC’s 15th anniversary and ECOWAS’s 50th anniversary. The event, themed “Reflecting, Reconnecting and Reimagining the ALC @ 15,” was co-organised with Amandla Institute, CODESRIA, WATHI, and featured the African Public Square (APS), an initiative of ALC, as part of ECOWAS @ 50 celebrations to debate regional integration futures.

Past and current alumni coordinators, in addition to Shuvai Busuman Nyoni, include Njoki Wamai, Toyin Ajao, Clement Sefa-Nyarko, and Saramba Kandeh, who currently serves as Coordinator and a member of the ALC Board of Trustees.

== Key people ==
- Eka Ikpe, Director, ALC London
- Funmi Olonisakin, Founding Director
- Abiodun Alao, Programme Director, London
- Shuvai Busuman Nyoni, Executive Director, ALC Nairobi
- Mshai Mwangola an adjunct faculty member, ALC Nairobi
- Fatima Akilu, Visiting Senior Research Fellow, London
- Kizza Besigye, Visiting Senior Research Fellow, London
- Alex Vines, Senior Visiting Fellow, London
- Youssef Mahmoud, Visiting Senior Research Fellow, London
- Bisi Adeleye-Fayemi, Visiting Senior Research Fellow, London
- Godwin Murunga, Former Executive Director, ALC Nairobi
- Maxi Schoeman, Former Visiting Professor at KCL London
- Zeedah Meierhofer-Mangeli, African Leadership Centre Trustee

== Notable alumni ==
- Abratha Doe, Assistant Minister of Foreign Affairs, Liberia
- Fatou Bintou Sallah, First Class Magistrate, The Gambia
- Togolani Mavura, Ambassador of Tanzania to Korea
- Habibu Yaya Bappah, Commissioner for Internal Service, ECOWAS.
- Ebenezer Asiedu, Head of Mediation Facilitation Division in ECOWAS.
- Nokukhanya Nox Ntuli, Office of the Compliance Advisor Ombudsman (CAO), World Bank Group
- Njoki Wamai, Cambridge Scholar and Assistant Professor, United States International University Africa.
- Toyin Ajao, African Leadership Centre Research Associate and Director of Ìmọ́lẹ̀ of Afrika Centre (ìAfrika).
- Clement Sefa-Nyarko, staff member at the ALC, King’s College London; works on resource governance and energy transitions.
