= Funmi Olonisakin =

British-Nigerian scholar (born 1965)

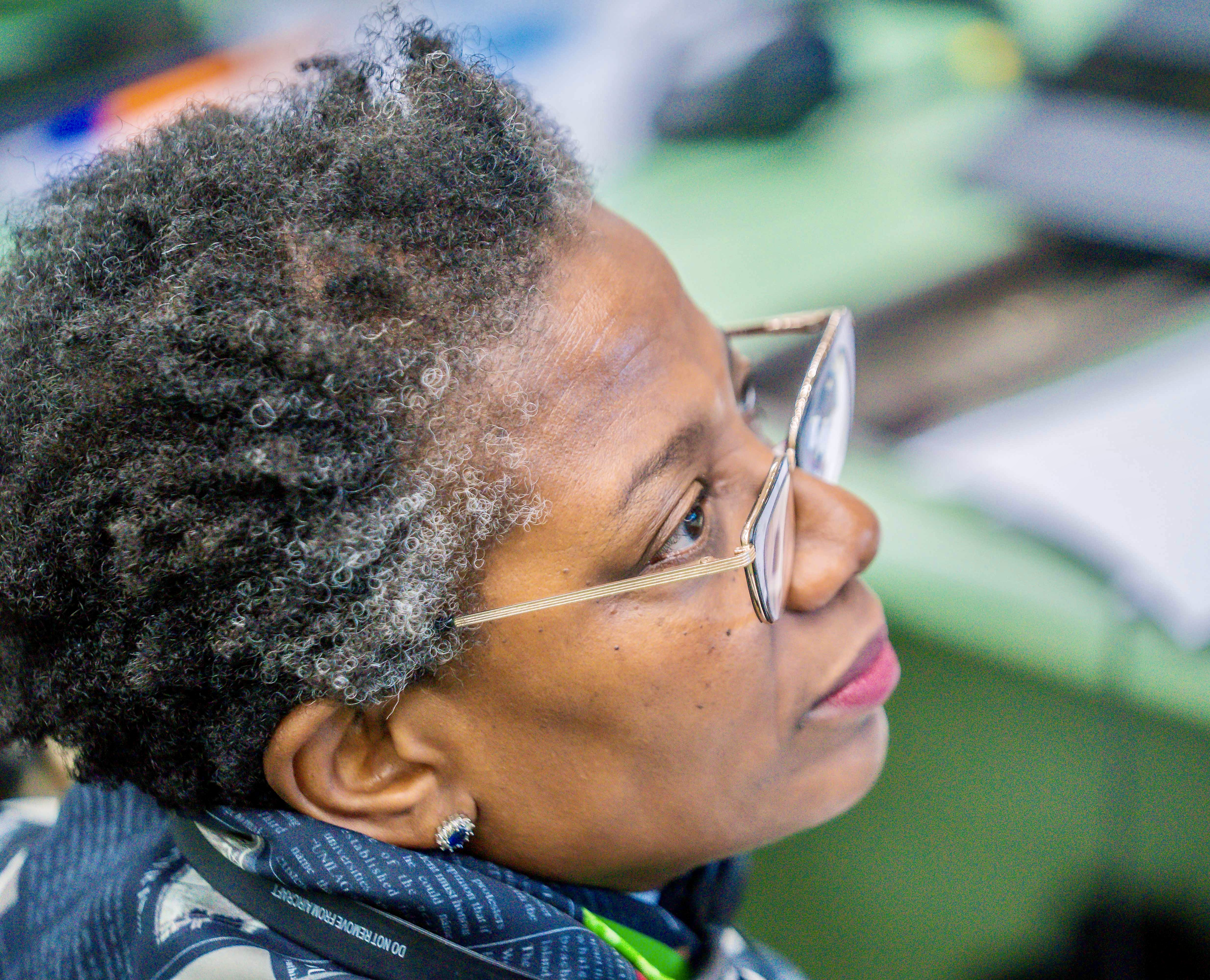
- Olonisakin in Abuja at the ECOWAS 50th Anniversary, 2025
- Born: 8 February 1965 (age 61)
- Citizenship: British Nigerian
- Education: PhD
- Alma mater: University of Ife; Obafemi Awolowo University; King's College London
- Occupations: Lecturer, Researcher
- Known for: Peace, security and leadership scholarship
- Title: Vice President/Principal (International) of King's College London
- Website: funmiolonisakin.com

Funmi Olonisakin (born 8 February 1965) is a British Nigerian scholar, feminist and academic whose work focuses on leadership, security, peace, and conflict studies. She is a professor at King's College London and an Extra-Ordinary Professor at the University of Pretoria. She is the founder and former director of the African Leadership Centre (ALC), where she has played a key role in mentoring the next generation of African scholars, practitioners and leaders.

In 2018, Olonisakin delivered her inaugural lecture at King's College London, becoming the first Black woman and black female professor to do so. Olonisakin currently serves as Vice President (Principal) for International Affairs at King's College London.

== Education ==
Olonisakin was born in South London to Nigerian parents. She earned a Bachelor of Science degree in Political Science from University Of Ile-Ife, Nigeria in 1984. She completed a master's degree in War Studies in 1990 and earned a PhD in War Studies at King's College London in 1996.

== Career ==
=== Academic career and leadership ===
Olonisakin has held several senior academic and leadership roles in the fields of peace, security, and leadership studies. She is a professor at King's College London and an Extra-Ordinary Professor at the University of Pretoria. Rising through her career at King's College London, she was Director of the Conflict, Security and Development Group between 2003 and 2013, and subsequently served as Vice-Dean (International) in the Faculty of Social Science and Public Policy. She currently serves as Vice President (Principal) for International Affairs at the university.

=== African Leadership Centre ===
In 2010, Olonisakin founded the African Leadership Centre (ALC), a pan-African institution focused on leadership development and peace and security scholarship in Africa through mentoring and the pursuit of academic excellence of their fellows in Nairobi and London. She served as the first Director leading initiatives such as Women Peace and Security Fellowship between 2010 and 2014 before stepping down into other interconnected roles while supporting the ALC in academic, research, mentorship and advisory capacities.

=== Policy, advisory, and international service ===
Olonisakin has held a number of policy and advisory roles with international and regional organisations. She has previously worked with the United Nations, including through the Office of the Special Representative of the Secretary-General for Children and Armed Conflict, where she managed the Africa unit. While in this role, she established the National Commission for War-Affected Children in Sierra Leone and the Child Protection Unit within ECOWAS.

In 2015, Ban Ki Moon appointed her to the United Nations Advisory Group of Experts on the Review of the UN Peacebuilding Architecture. She was likewise appointed a member of the Advisory Group of Experts for the UN Progress Study on Youth, Peace and Security in 2016.

In 2018, on the invitation of the UNESCO Director-General, Audrey Azoulay she joined the Council of the United Nations University, concluding her term in May 2025.

Olonisakin has contributed to international policy dialogue through service on advisory boards and governance bodies. She has been a member of the World Economic Forum's Global Agenda Council on Fragile States, and has held board or advisory roles with International Alert and the Centre for Humanitarian Dialogue. She has served on the International Advisory Board of the Thabo Mbeki African Leadership Institute. She currently serves as board members of the Pan-African University Press and Olusegun Obasanjo Leadership Institute (OOLI) in Nigeria.

== Honours and recognition ==
In 2018, Olonisakin delivered her inaugural lecture at King's College London, becoming the first Black woman to do so.

She has received academic recognition through fellowships, including the distinguished scholar of the Andrew Mellon Foundation and a distinguished fellow of the Geneva Centre for Security Policy (GCSP).

Olonisakin has also been recognised for her public and academic contributions through inclusion in the Powerlist, which ranks the most influential people of African and African-Caribbean heritage in the United Kingdom. She appeared in the 2019, 2020, and 2021 editions of the list.

In 2022, the University of Pretoria conferred on Olonisakin the degree of Doctor of Philosophy (honoris causa) in recognition of her significant contributions to the promotion of peace, security, justice, and international solidarity in Africa, with particular reference to women and youth.

== Selected publications ==
=== Books ===
- Militancy and Violence in West Africa: Religion, Politics and Radicalization, ed.James Gow, Funmi Olonisakin & Ernst Dijxhoorn. London: Routledge, 2013. ISBN 9780415821377
- Women and Security Governance in Africa, ed. Funmi Olonisakin & Awino Okech. Oxford: Pambazuka Press, 2011. ISBN 9781906387891
- Women, Peace and Security: Translating Policy into Practice, ed. Funmi Olonisakin, Karen Barnes & Eka Ikpe. London: Routledge,2011. ISBN 9780415587976
- Security Sector Transformation in Africa, ed. Alan Bryden & Funmi Olonisakin. Munster: Lit Verlag, 2010. ISBN 9783643800718
- The Challenges of Security Sector Governance in West Africa, ed. Alan Bryden, Boubacar Ndiaye & Funmi Olonisakin. Munster: Lit Verlag, 2008. ISBN 9783037350218
- Peacekeeping in Sierra Leone: The Story of UNAMSIL. Boulder and London: Lynne Reinner, 2008. ISBN 9781588265203
- Global Development and Human Security, ed. Robert Picciotto, Funmi Olonisakin & Michael ClarkeNew Brunswick and London: Transaction Publishers, 2007. ISBN 9781412811484
- A Handbook of Security Sector Governance in Africa, ed. Nicole Ball & Kayode Fayemi. London: Centre for Democracy and Development, 2004.
- Reinventing Peacekeeping in Africa: Conceptual and Legal Issues in the ECOMOG Operations. The Hague: Kluwer Law International, 2000. ISBN 9789041113214
- Engaging Sierra Leone. London: Centre for Democracy and Development, 2000. ISBN 9781902296081
- Peacekeepers, Politicians and Warlords, by Abiodun Alao, Funmi Olonisakin & John Mackinlay Tokyo: United Nations University Press, 1999. ISBN 9789280810318

== See also ==
- Cynthia Chigwenya – Zimbabwean political researcher and pracademic
- Njoki Wamai – Kenyan political scientist and scholar of peace and security in Africa
- Awino Okech – Professor of Feminist and Security Studies at SOAS, University of London
- Bisi Adeleye-Fayemi – Nigerian feminist activist, writer, and co-founder of the African Women's Development Fund
- Eka Ikpe – Nigerian development economist and Director of the African Leadership Centre at King's College London
- Toyin Ajao – Nigerian scholar and founder of Ìmọ́lẹ̀ of Afrika Centre, focused on restorative healing of intergenerational trauma
- Fatima Akilu – Nigerian psychologist and director of the Neem Foundation, focused on mental health and countering violent extremism
