= Youssef Mahmoud =

Tunisian official of the United Nations and academic (born 1947)

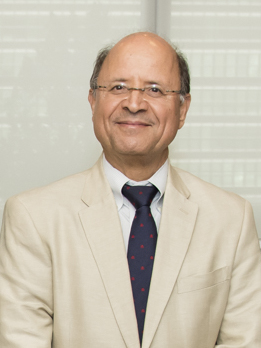
- Youssef Mahmoud in 2017
- Citizenship: Tunisian
- Education: PhD in Linguistics
- Alma mater: Georgetown University, University of Tunis
- Occupations: Diplomat, academic
- Employer: International Peace Institute
- Organizations: African Leadership Centre, King's College London
- Known for: UN peace operations; leadership in peacebuilding
- Notable work: Whose Peace Are We Building? Leadership for Peace in Africa (2021)
- Title: Visiting Professor

Youssef Mahmoud is a Tunisian diplomat, academic, and peacebuilding practitioner. He is Senior Adviser Emeritus at the International Peace Institute (IPI) and Visiting Professor at the African Leadership Centre (ALC), King's College London, where he serves as a leading practitioner and research fellow on the Centre’s Practice of Leadership Programme. Mahmoud is a former United Nations Under-Secretary-General who headed peace operations in Burundi and Chad/Central African Republic and served on the UN Secretary-General’s High-Level Panel on Peace Operations.

== Education ==
Youssef Mahmoud earned a Bachelor of Arts and Master of Arts from the University of Tunis, specializing in American and British Studies. Mahmoud later pursued graduate studies at Georgetown University in the United States, where he obtained a Master of Science and a PhD in Linguistics.

== Career ==
Mahmoud joined the United Nations in 1981 and served in various capacities, including:

- Special Representative of the Secretary-General for the United Nations Mission in the Central African Republic and Chad (MINURCAT) from June 2010.
- Executive Representative of the Secretary-General and Head of the UN Integrated Peacebuilding Office in Burundi (BINUB) from 2007 to 2009.
- United Nations Resident Coordinator and Humanitarian Coordinator in Guyana and Cambodia (UNTAC).
- Director in the UN Department of Political Affairs and Head of the Office of the Under-Secretary-General for Political Affairs.

In 2015, Mahmoud served on the UN Secretary-General’s High-Level Panel on Peace Operations (HIPPO) and the High-Level Advisory Group for the Global Study on Security Council Resolution 1325 on Women, Peace and Security. In 2019, he led an independent strategic review of the UN peace operation in the Democratic Republic of Congo (MONUSCO).

== Academic and leadership roles ==
Before joining the UN, Mahmoud was Assistant Professor of Linguistics at the University of Tunis and Chair of the English Department at the Bourguiba Institute of Modern Languages. He is Visiting Professor and leading practitioner at the African Leadership Centre (ALC), King's College London, where he contributes to research and training on peacebuilding and governance. He mentors emerging African leaders through the Practice of Leadership Programme and co-authored publications in ALC’s Leading Practitioners Reflection Series. Mahmoud also serves as Senior Adviser Emeritus at the International Peace Institute, where he provides strategic guidance on peacebuilding and multilateral diplomacy.

== Selected publications ==
- Whose Peace Are We Building? Leadership for Peace in Africa (Bloomsbury Academic, 2021). ISBN 9780755618880.
- “What Does Collective Leadership Have To Do With COVID-19 and Peace?” – IPI Global Observatory, May 2021.
- “Peace as the Norm: Sustaining Peace in Africa” – IPI Global Observatory, July 2022.
- “Financing for Peacebuilding: Beyond Money” – IPI Global Observatory, October 2022.
- “A New Agenda for Peace: Making Peace Plural and Healing Historical Traumas” – IPI Global Observatory, April 2023.
- “From Leadership to Healership: Cultivating a Future Worthy of Generations to Come” – co-authored with Joni Carley, Jude Currivan, and Grant Storry, Kosmos Journal, Volume 25 Issue 4.

== Personal life ==
He is married with two children.

== See also ==
- Peacebuilding
- King's College London
- African Leadership Centre
- International Peace Institute
- United Nations Integrated Office in Burundi
- United Nations Mission in the Central African Republic and Chad
