= Abiodun Alao =

Nigerian academic (born 1961)

- Citizenship: Nigerian
- Education: University of Ibadan; University of Ife; King's College London
- Occupations: Lecturer, researcher

Abiodun Alao is a Nigerian academic and professor of African studies at King's College London and the programme director of the African Leadership Centre. He is also the chair of the King's College London Africa Community of Practice and between December 2013 and August 2015 held a visiting professorship position at the Nigerian Defence Academy, Kaduna, Nigeria. He is the author of A New Narrative for Africa: Voice and Agency, which "examines the perception of Africa in the global system, tracing Africa's transition from a "problem" to be solved into an agent with a rising voice in the world."

== Education ==
Born to primary school teacher parents, Alao had his elementary education in Iwo and Ogbomosho in South-West Nigeria. He received his secondary education at Fiditi Grammar School, Fiditi and Federal Government College Ilorin and his University education at the Universities of Ibadan and Ife where he studied history and international relations respectively for his bachelor's and master's degrees in 1983 and 1985. He later proceeded to King's College London as a Ford Foundation Scholar for his Ph.D in War Studies in 1987. He completed his doctoral thesis on The Defence and Security Implications of the War of Liberation in Zimbabwe in 1991. The results of Alao's thesis has formed the basis of two books: Brothers at War: Dissidence and Rebellion in Southern Africa, London: British Academic Press and Mugabe and the Politics of Security in Zimbabwe, Montreal: McGill-Queens University Press. He went on later to hold the SSRC-MacArthur Post-Doctoral Fellowship in 1994.

== Career ==
Alao began his career in 1985 as an assistant lecturer at the Department of International Relations, University of Ife, (later Obafemi Awolowo University) Ile Ife, Nigeria. In 1990, he was a visiting research associate at the Department of History, University of Zimbabwe. Between 1994 and 1996, he was a lecturer in the Department of War Studies King's College London. He later became a research fellow at the Centre for Defence Studies, King's College London between September 1996 and August 1999. Alao became a senior research fellow between 1999 and 2013. In September 2013, Alao advanced to a senior lecturer at the International Development Institute at King's College London and was promoted professor of African studies at the King's College London's School of Global Affairs in September 2014.

Alao has, in the last two decades, regularly delivered lectures at many military and policy-oriented institutions, including the Centre for the Democratic Control of Armed Forces (DECAF) Geneva, Royal College of Defence Studies London, Geneva Centre for Security Policy,(GCSP), Rwandan Military Academy, Nigerian Defence Academy, the Defence Intelligence and Security Centre, Chicksands, UK, Nigerian National Defence College, Nigeria Command and Staff College Jaji.

Alao delivered his inaugural lecture as professor of African studies at the Edward Safra Lecture Theatre, King's College London on 26 April 2016. The lecture, titled "Africa: A voice to be Heard, Not a Problem to be Solved" is believed to be the first to be delivered by a Black African since the establishment of the college in 1829.

== Scholarship ==
Alao carried out series of research that highlighted the danger embedded in the mismanagement of African vast natural resources making it seemed a curse than a blessing. He has contributed significantly to development projects across the world by working extensively and regularly with many international, regional and intergovernmental organisations, such as the United Nations, African Union, European Union, World Bank, ECOWAS and several others. He was part of the 4-person team that visited Rwanda and undertook a Comprehensive Threat Assessment for the country immediately after the 1994 genocide and was on the Team of Academic Experts that advised the Office of the UN Secretary General on the civil war in Sierra Leone. Alao also co-authored the Concept Note for the Common Defence and Security Policy for the Africa Union and was the co-author of the first post-Civil War National Security Strategy Framework for Liberia. He also advised the Liberian Government on the Reorganisation of the country's Foreign Policy Institute. Additionally, Alao was a member of the team that worked on the Development of Donor Countries Effectiveness in Fragile States.

Alao was also part of the team that assisted ECOWAS and the Canadian Government on the establishment of the Child Protection Unit (CPU) within the ECOWAS structure. Furthermore, Alao was a member of the Four-Person team undertook a comprehensive evaluation of the activities of the Bureau for Crisis Prevention and Recovery (BCPR) of the United Nations Development Programme (UNDP) during the first 5 years of its operation. In addition, he wrote the Lead Paper for the United Nations' Office of the Special Adviser on Africa (OSAA) on the link between climate change and conflict over natural resources in Africa and another Lead Paper for OSAA on The ways of addressing the Illegal Exploitation of Natural Resources in Africa. Alao also served as a member of the steering committee of the FOREWARN Project including ECOWAS, ALC/KCL, Humanitarian Futures, among many others. He is working with the United Nations on the link between Radicalisation and Violence and with ECOWAS on the development of Policy Framework for Security Sector Reform and Governance He is also on the advisory board of the African Leadership Centre in Nairobi, Kenya and on the board of trustees, Federal Government College Ilorin Old Students Association.

The governor of Osun State, Rauf Aregbesola, appointed Alao, a member of the Governing Council of Osun State University, Osogbo, Nigeria, while the Federal Government of Nigeria appointed him, a member of the Governing Council of the Federal University of Petroleum Resources, Efurun.

== Selected publications ==
=== Books ===
- Religion, Public Health and Human Security in Nigeria, London: Routledge 2023 ISBN 9781032365220
- Rage and Carnage in the Name of God: Religious Violence in Nigeria, Durham: Duke University Press 2022 ISBN 9781478022770
- A New Narrative for Africa Voice and Agency, London: Routledge 2019 ISBN 9780367228637
- China and African Security, London: Palgrave Macmillan (Co-edited with Chris Alden and Zhang Chun) 2017 ISBN 9783319528939
- Mugabe and the Politics of Security in Zimbabwe, Montreal: McGill-Queens University Press., 2012 ISBN 9780773540439
- Nigeria and the United States: Twists and Turns over 50 Years, New York: African Peace Support Publishers (Co-Edited with Shola Omoregie) 2011
- Natural Resources and Conflict in Africa: The Tragedy of Endowment, Rochester: University of Rochester Press, 2007 ISBN 1580462677
- The Mau-Mau Warrior, Oxford: Osprey Publishing Company, (OSPREY Warrior Series 108) 2006, ISBN 1846030242
- Peacekeepers, Politicians and Warlords: The Liberian Peace Process, New York: United Nations University Press, Co-Authored with John Mackinlay and Funmi Olonisakin (1999) ISBN 9280810316
- Africa after the Cold War: The Changing Perspective on Security, Trenton, New Jersey: African World Press, (Co-edited with Adebayo Oyebade) 1998 ISBN 0865436517
- The Burden of Collective Goodwill: The International Involvement in the Liberian Civil War, Aldershot: Ashgate Publishers, 1996, ISBN 1840143185
- Brothers at War: Dissidence and Rebellion in Southern Africa, London: British Academic Press, 1994 ISBN 1850438161
- Security Reform in Democratic Nigeria, King's College London Conflict Security and Development (Working Paper, No. 2). 2000 ISSN 1467-8799
- African Conflicts: The Future without the Cold War, (46 Pages) London: Brassey Publishers 1993, ISSN 0961-8422
