= Satang Nabaneh =

Gambian legal scholar and human rights practitioner

- Born: The Gambia
- Citizenship: Gambian
- Education: LL.B., University of The Gambia; LL.M., LL.D., University of Pretoria
- Occupations: Professor of Law, Legal scholar, Feminist Activist
- Employer: University of Dayton
- Known for: Gender justice, constitutional law, reproductive rights
- Website: satangnabaneh.com

Satang Nabaneh is a Gambian legal scholar, feminist activist, and human rights practitioner. She is Director of Programs and Research Professor of Law at the University of Dayton Human Rights Center in the United States.

== Early life and education ==
Nabaneh was born in The Gambia, and her childhood, which was shaped by activism led to her choice of profession in human rights law. She earned her Bachelor of Laws (LL.B.) from the University of The Gambia. She completed her Master of Laws (LL.M.) in Human Rights and Democratization in Africa and her Doctor of Laws (LL.D.) at the University of Pretoria.

== Career ==
Nabaneh is the director of programs for the Human Rights Center and a research professor of law at the University of Dayton School of Law, Ohio. Her research and activism spans international human rights law, comparative constitutional law, feminist legal theory, women's rights, gender equality and sexual and reproductive health and rights issues. She is a member of the Panel of Experts of the Initiative for Strategic Litigation in Africa (ISLA).

In 2024, she was named one of the "10 African Scholars to Watch" by The Africa Report alongside Toyin Ajao, Naminata Diabate, and Simukai Chigudu. In February 2026, Nabaneh was elected as a member of the African Committee of Experts on the Rights and Welfare of the Child (ACERWC), a body of the African Union. Her appointment as the inaugural Judge John Meagher Endowed Assistant Professor in Transitional Justice and Human Rights at the University of Dayton was announced in August 2026.

== Research and advocacy ==
Nabaneh's research addresses the intersections of law, gender, and health in African legal systems. She has written on and advocated for sexual and reproductive rights, conscientious objection in abortion care, and constitutional reform from a gender perspective. In 2024, she delivered a keynote lecture on "Gendered Politics of Autocratization in Africa" at the University of Bergen's Centre for Research on Discretion and Paternalism and LawTransform. In May 2024, Nabaneh was quoted in Time magazine expressing concern that repealing The Gambia's ban on female genital mutilation could undermine regional efforts to protect women's rights.

== Selected publications ==
- Sexual Harassment, Law and Human Rights in Africa (Palgrave Macmillan, 2023), co-editor. ISBN 9783031323669
- The Gambia in Transition: Towards a New Constitutional Order (Pretoria University Law Press, 2022), co-editor. ISBN 9781776411658
- Choice and Conscience: Lessons from South Africa for a Global Debate (Pretoria University Law Press, 2023), editor. ISBN 9781776411672
- "Abortion and 'conscientious objection' in South Africa: The need for regulation", in E. Durojaye, G. Mirugi-Mukundi & C. Ngwena (eds), Advancing Sexual and Reproductive Health and Rights in Africa: Constraints and Opportunities (Routledge, 2021), pp. 16–34. ISBN 9781032006284
- "The Gambia's Political Transition to Democracy: Is Abortion Reform Possible?", Health and Human Rights Journal, 21(2), December 2019, pp. 169–179.

== See also ==
- Naminata Diabate
- Simukai Chigudu
- Fatou Baldeh
- Toyin Ajao
