= Ruth Murambadoro =

Zimbabwean political scientist and African feminist scholar

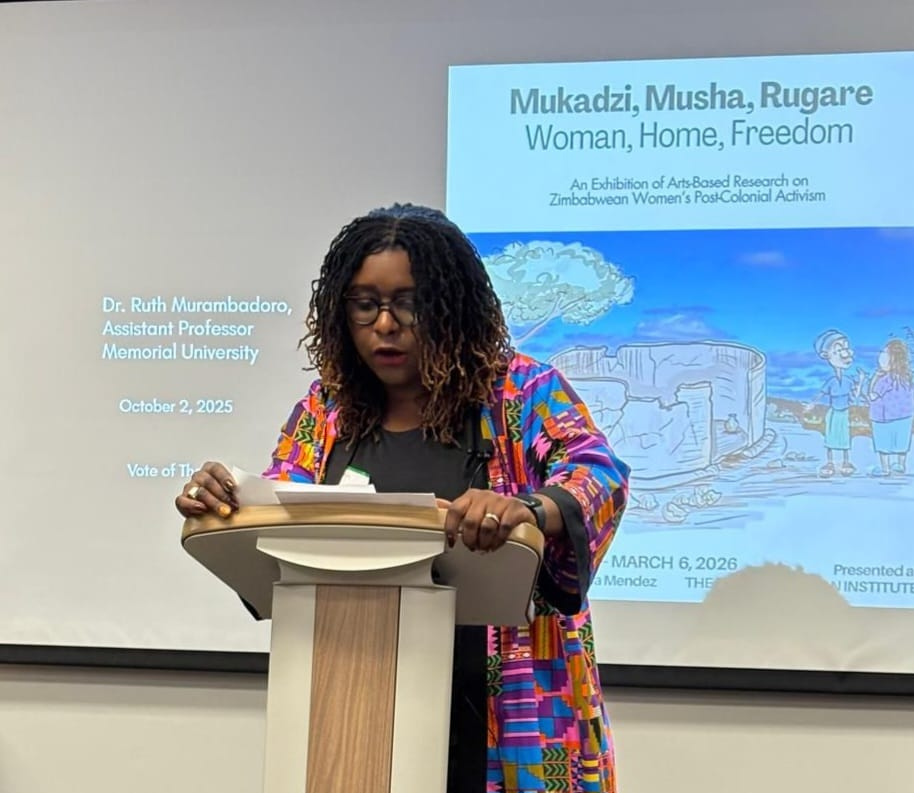
- Ruth Murambadoro in 2025
- Citizenship: Zimbabwean
- Education: University of Pretoria (DPhil, MA in Political Sciences, BA Honours in International Relations, BPolSci)
- Occupations: Assistant Professor, political feminist, researcher
- Employer: Memorial University of Newfoundland
- Notable work: Transitional Justice in Africa: The Case of Zimbabwe (2020)

Ruth Ratidzai Murambadoro (also known as Ruth Murambadoro) is a Zimbabwean Black political feminist and scholar, whose research explores transitional justice, feminist theory, gender justice, and peacebuilding in the Global South. She is currently an Assistant Professor of Gender Studies at Memorial University of Newfoundland in Canada. She authored Transitional justice in Africa: The case of Zimbabwe monograph in 2020.

== Education ==
Murambadoro holds a DPhil and an MA in Political Sciences, a BA Honours in International Relations, and a BPolSci, all from the University of Pretoria.

== Academic career ==
Murambadoro joined Memorial University of Newfoundland in 2024 as an Assistant Professor in Gender Studies. She was a Postdoctoral Fellow at York University, affiliated with the Harriet Tubman Institute and the Centre for Feminist Research. She was a Senior Lecturer at the University of the Witwatersrand from 2019 to 2021. In 2022, She joined the Centre for Conflict Research, Philipps University of Marburg, Germany as a guest researcher.

Murambadoro was a visiting fellow of the Centre of African Studies University of Cambridge in 2019 and a doctoral fellow of the Social Science Research Council's Next Generation Social Sciences in Africa programme from 2015 to 2018. She served as an Emerging Scholar representative on the African Studies Association (ASA) Board of Directors in 2016 and received the ASA Presidential Fellowship in 2015. Her Transitional Justice in Africa: The Case of Zimbabwe book, released in 2020, has been recognized for exploring how justice is understood and applied in African contexts, emphasizing local and community-based approaches to post-conflict reconciliation.

Murambadoro collaborated with Ugandan scholar and editorial cartoonist Jimmy Spire Ssentongo on African and transnational feminisms through a panel discussion and creative exhibition events hosted by York University’s Centre for Feminist Research in October 2025. In February 2026, Murambadoro delivered a keynote lecture at the Association for New Canadians' Black History Month celebration in St. John's, Newfoundland and Labrador.

== Awards and fellowships ==
- Shortlisted and runner-up for the Africa Thesis Award, African Studies Centre Leiden, Leiden University, 2015.
- African Studies Association Presidential Fellowship Award, 2015.
- African Pathways Doctoral Fellowship, National Institution for the Humanities and Social Sciences, 2015–2017.
- Three-time recipient of the Next Generation Social Sciences in Africa Fellowship Award, 2015–2018.
- Tuks Young Research Leader Award, University of Pretoria, 2017.
- Visiting Research Fellowship, Centre of African Studies, University of Cambridge, 2019.
- Guest Researcher Fellowship Award, Nordic Africa Institute, 2020.

== Selected publications ==
- Murambadoro, Ruth; Mandizvidza, Wilson, eds. (2022). The PhD Experience in African Higher Education. Rowman & Littlefield. ISBN 9781793645371.
- Murambadoro, Ruth (2020). Transitional Justice in Africa: The Case of Zimbabwe. Palgrave Macmillan. ISBN 9783030480912.
- “Beyond restorative justice: Understanding justice from an African perspective,” Ubuntu: Journal of Conflict and Social Transformation, 9(1), 2020, pp. 43–69.
- “‘We cannot reconcile until the past has been acknowledged’: Perspectives on Gukurahundi from Matabeleland, Zimbabwe,” African Journal on Conflict Resolution, 15(1), 2015, pp. 33–57.

== See also ==
- Peacebuilding
- Transitional justice
- Cynthia Chigwenya
- Jimmy Spire Ssentongo
