= Eka Ikpe =

Nigerian academic and development economist

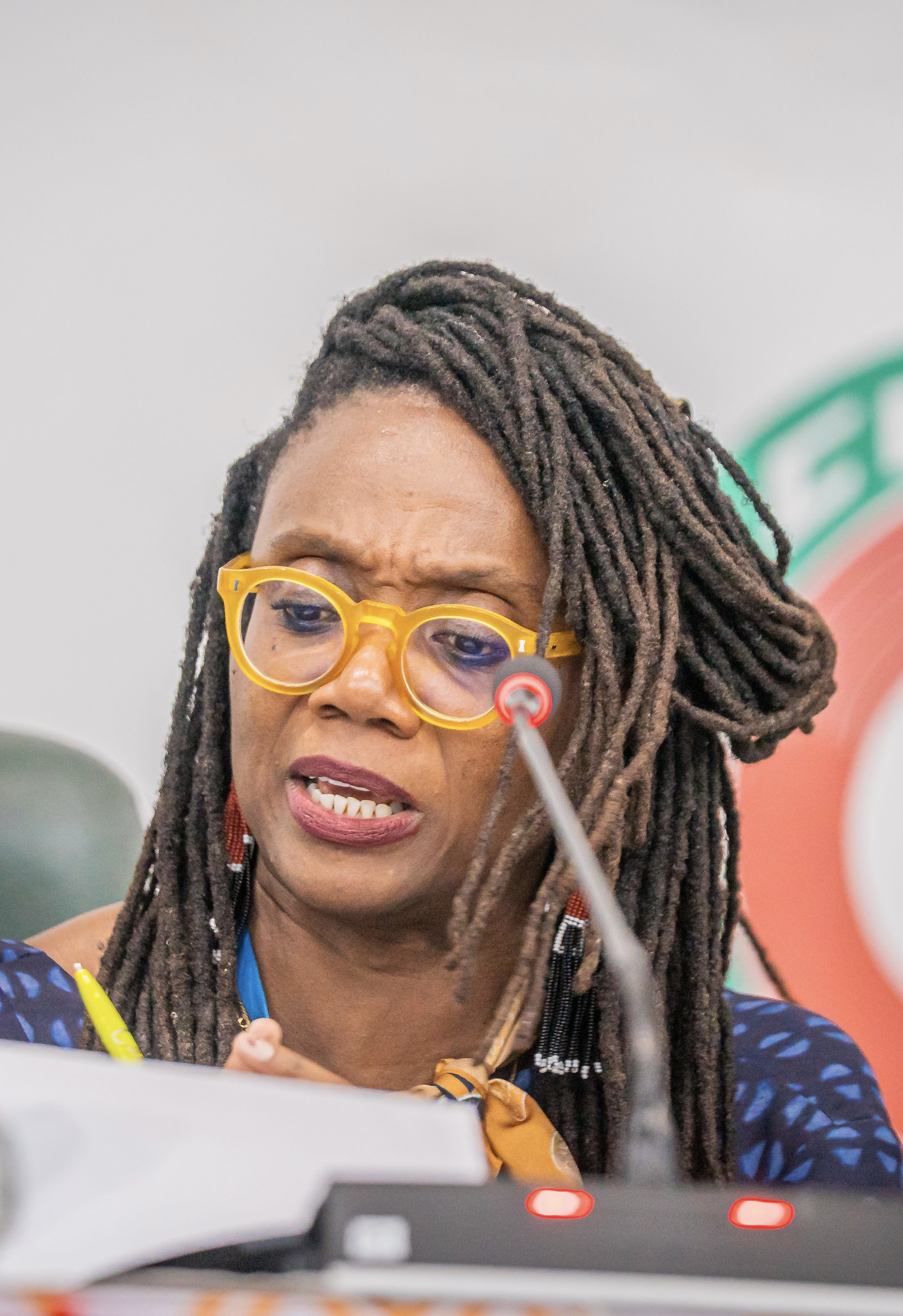
- Ikpe at ECOWAS 50th Anniversary Abuja 2025
- Born: Ekaette Ikpe
- Citizenship: Nigerian
- Education: University of Leeds (BA in Economics); SOAS (MSc and PhD in Economics)
- Occupations: Academic, Development Economist
- Employer: King's College London
- Known for: African development; Peacebuilding; Creative economies
- Website: kcl.ac.uk/people/eka-ikpe

Eka Ikpe is a Nigerian academic, creative economist and a professor of Development economics at King's College London. She is also the Director of the African Leadership Centre at King's College London. Her work focuses on structural transformation, peacebuilding, health, creative economies, and state capital and developmentalism in Africa and parts of Global South.

== Education ==
Ikpe holds a Bachelor of Arts in economics from the University of Leeds, Master of Science in economics (with reference to Africa), and a PhD in economics from the School of Oriental and African Studies (SOAS).

== Career ==
Ikpe is currently a Professor of Development Economics and the Director of the African Leadership Centre at King's College London. Her foci include creative economies, capital and developmentalism, industrial development, health, structural transformation, peacebuilding and reconstruction. She has contributed written evidence to the UK Parliament on peacebuilding in Africa, including mine action, which involves managing the dangers posed by land mines.

Ikpe has also made media appearances on BBC World News, Al Jazeera, Radio France International, The Institute of Art and Ideas, and Mail & Guardian. She was a keynote speaker at the University of Warwick’s “Blood on the Leaves” conference on race, resistance, and memory. Ikpe is a Global Board Member of the Overseas Development Institute (ODI).

== Selected publications ==
- "Fashion Designers as Lead Firms from Below: Creative Economy, State Capitalism and Internationalization in Lagos and Nairobi". Competition & Change (2024). DOI
- Nasong'o, Shadrack Wanjala; Ikpe, Eka, eds. (2022). Beyond Disciplines: African Perspectives on Theory and Method. CODESRIA. ISBN 9782382340929.
- "Developmental Post-Conflict Reconstruction in Postindependence Nigeria: Lessons From Asian Developmental States". Journal of Peacebuilding & Development, Vol. 16(3) (2021). DOI
- "Transcending the State-Market Dichotomy, Developmentalism and Industrial Change: Learning from Critical African Scholars". Africa Development, Vol. XLVI(3), pp. 21–44 (2021). JSTOR
- "Africa Fashion Futures: Creative Economies, Global Networks and Local Development". Geography Compass, Vol. 15(9) (2021). Co-authored with Lauren England, Roberta Comunian, and Ananya Jahanara Kabir. DOI
- Ikpe, E. (2021). "Developmental Post-Conflict Reconstruction in Postindependence Nigeria: Lessons From Asian Developmental States". Journal of Peacebuilding & Development, pp.318–335. JSTOR
- Ikpe, Eka; Torriti, Jacopo (2018). "A Means to an Industrialisation End? Demand Side Management in Nigeria". Energy Policy. 115: 207–215. DOI
- "Counting the Development Costs of the Conflict in North-Eastern Nigeria: The Economic Impact of the Boko Haram-led Insurgency". Conflict, Security & Development, Vol. 17(5), pp. 381–409 (2017). DOI
- "The Development Planning Era and Developmental Statehood: The Pursuit of Structural Transformation in Nigeria". Review of African Political Economy, Vol. 41(142), pp. 545–560 (2014). DOI JSTOR
- Olonisakin, Funmi; Barnes, Karen; Ikpe, Eka, eds. (2012). Women, Peace and Security: Translating Policy into Practice. Routledge. 272 pages. ISBN 9780415532495.

== See also ==
- Njoki Wamai – Kenyan political scientist and scholar of peace and security in Africa
- Awino Okech – Professor of Feminist and Security Studies at SOAS, University of London
- Toyin Ajao – Nigerian scholar and founder of Ìmọ́lẹ̀ of Afrika Centre, focused on restorative healing of intergenerational trauma
- Funmi Olonisakin – Founding Director of the African Leadership Centre and scholar of leadership and peacebuilding in Africa
