= James Vivian Clinton =

Nigerian journalist

James Vivian Clinton OBE
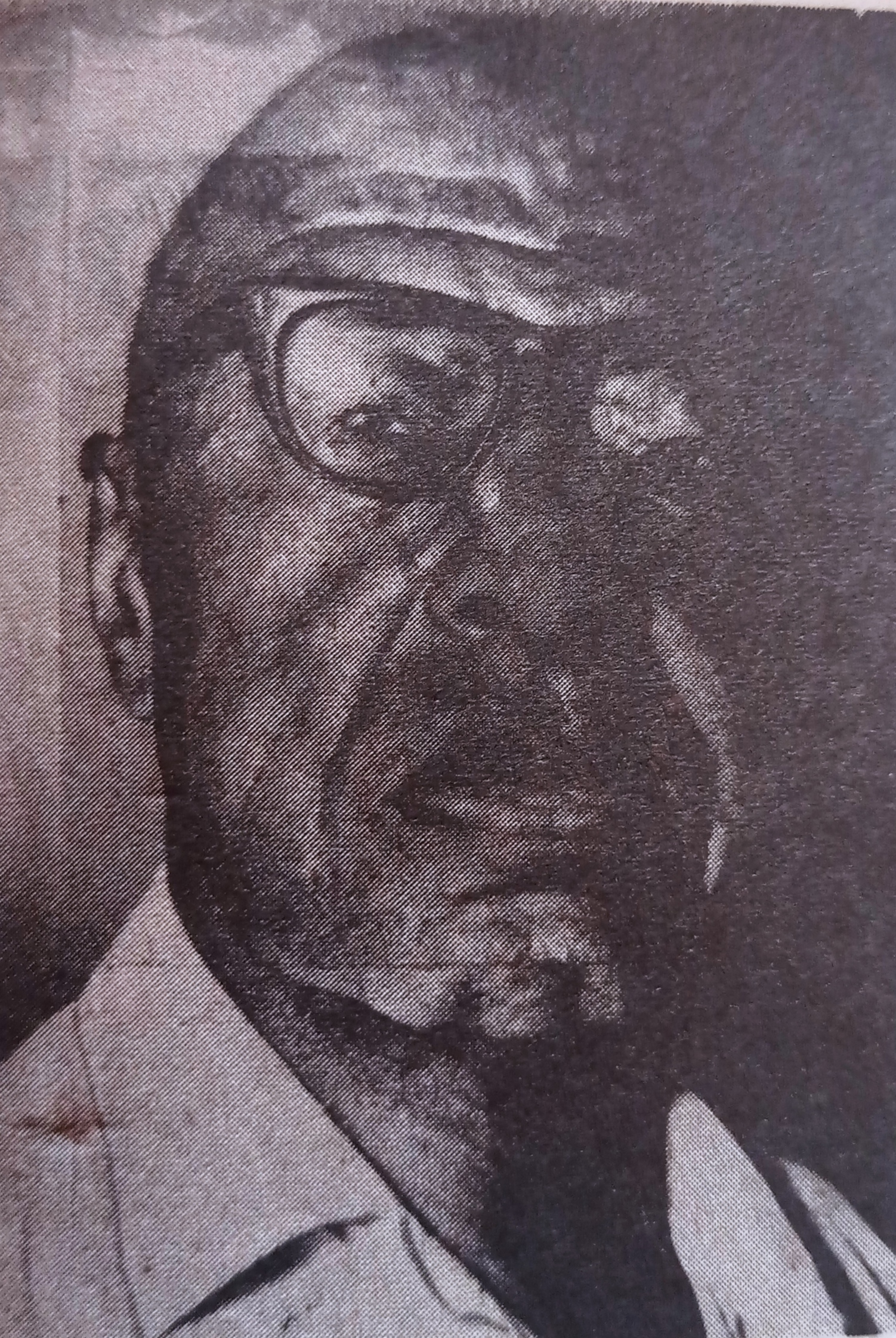
- Born: 6 February 1902; Axim
- Died: 18 May 1973 (aged 71); Lagos, Nigeria
- Occupation: Journalist

James Vivian Clinton (6 February 1902 – 18 May 1973) was a Gold Coast-born Sierra Leonean journalist and expatriate to Nigeria who came from a Sierra Leone Creole family of West Indian, Liberated African, and European origins that moved freely between many parts of West Africa. Although he maintained strong connections to the Sierra Leone Creole community, he eventually settled in Calabar in Nigeria and was awarded an OBE in 1949.

== Early life ==
Clinton was born on 6 February 1902 at Axim in Gold Coast. His grandfather, James Clerk Clinton, was a West Indian from St. Vincent, who had settled in Sierra Leone with his family and was a pioneer of the Mahogany trade in the Gold Coast, Liberia and Ivory Coast, and his father Charles Warner Clinton, who was born in Liberia, and received his early education in Sierra Leone, practised Law in Calabar, where he was also a member of the Legislative Council from 1928 to 1938. His mother, Muriel Clinton, a Sierra Leone Creole was born in Sierra Leone, and was a daughter of the Sierra Leone Creole Attorney-General of the then Gold Coast, now Ghana.

== Education ==
Clinton began his elementary schooling at Calabar in 1910 and went to a private preparatory school at Bexhill in Sussex and then at Taunton School in Somerset. He went on to Cambridge University where he obtained the B.A in History and Law. He was called to the bar at Lincoln's Inn Field in 1924.

== Career ==
After returning from England and spending time in Sierra Leone as a journalist, he settled in Calabar, Clinton joined his father as a partner in legal business, and later moved to Port Harcourt to set up his own practice in the late 1926. However, he became totally deaf after a protracted illness and he had to give up on law. His mother took him to Britain and Austria for treatment but he could not be cured. While in England, he first joined the London Institute of Estate Management to train as a surveyor but failed the examinations and decided to take up journalism. After five years in England where he worked in Fleet Street, Clinton returned to Sierra Leone and joined the staff of the Daily Mail of Sierra Leone, where he worked for three years before returning to Calabar. In 1935 with the help of his father he started the Nigerian Eastern Mail in Enugu. In 1951 Clinton sold the Eastern Mail to the Eastern Press Syndicate and agreed to edit a daily newspaper for the same syndicate in Enugu. He built up a fishing business based in Ibeno but the venture was not successful. In 1954 Clinton became the Senior Publicity Officer in the Federal Ministry of Information in Lagos until June 1962 when he retired. He briefly came out of retirement during the Action Group crisis in the Western Region and served as Chairman of the Western Nigeria Housing Corporation.

== Later life and death ==
Clinton's family moved back to Lagos in 1965 where he settled to life as a freelance journalist. He turned out a weekly editorial with the Sunday Times about his experiences. In 1971 he published The Rescue of Charlie Kalu with the Heinemann Publishers and had started a draft of his autobiography, The Fisherman's Story, before his death. He died in Lagos on 18 May 1973.
