= Toyin Ajao =

Nigerian scholar and Practitioner (born 1978)

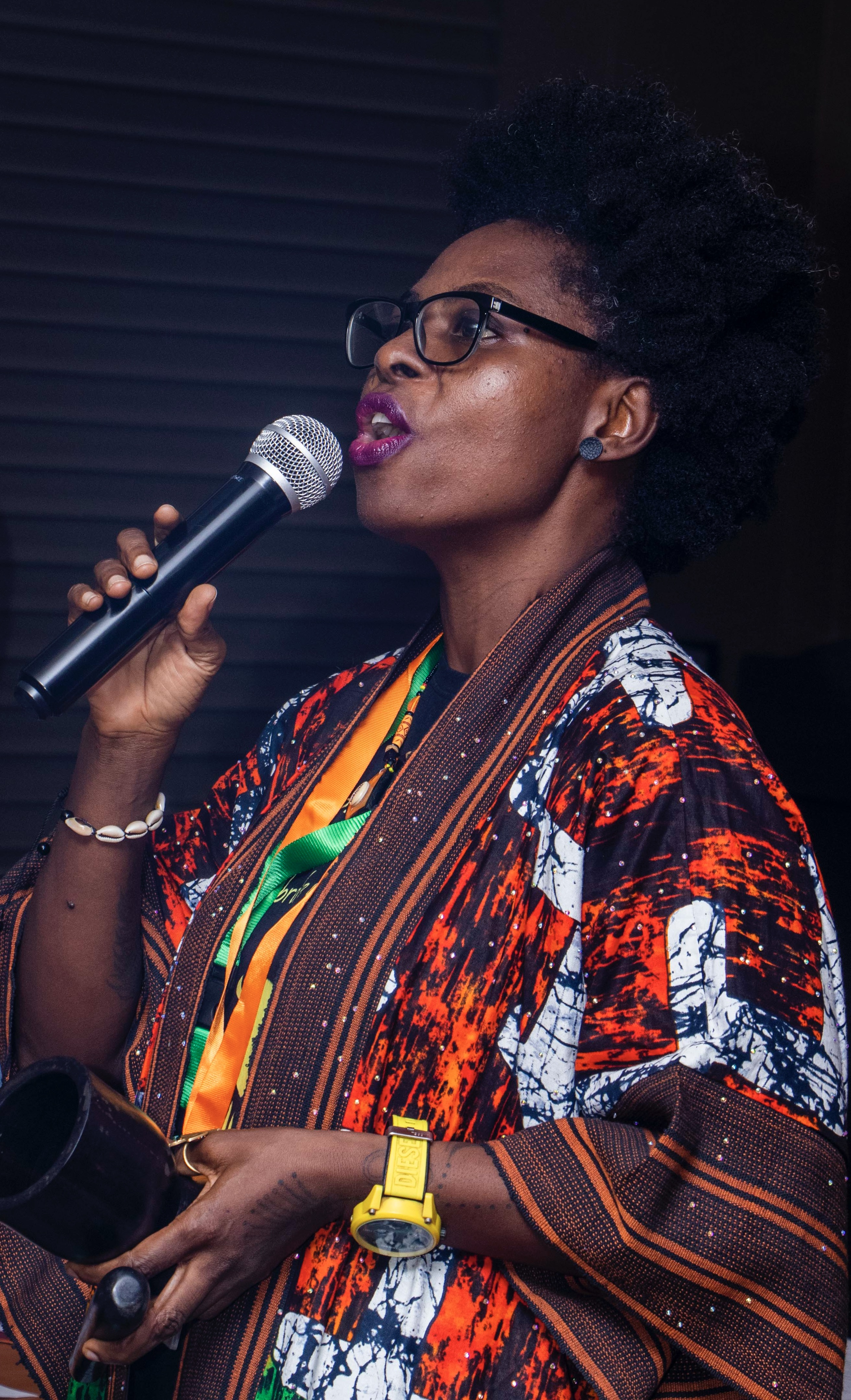
- Toyin Ajao in 2025
- Born: 13 July 1978 (age 48); Ikirun, Osun State
- Citizenship: Nigerian
- Education: Obafemi Awolowo University King's College London University of Pretoria
- Occupations: Scholar, activist, healer
- Organisation: Ìmọ́lẹ̀ of Afrika Centre

Toyin Ajao (born 13 July 1978) is a Nigerian scholar, feminist activist and healing practitioner. She is the founder of Ìmọ́lẹ̀ of Afrika Centre (ìAfrika), a non-profit working for marginalised African communities. In celebration of Black History Month in 2024, University of Exeter mentioned her alongside Kimberle Crenshaw, Linda Dobbs and Audre Lorde as an inspirational Black scholar.

== Education ==
Born in Ikirun, Osun State in 1978, Ajao holds a PhD in Political Science from the University of Pretoria, with a focus on conflict transformation and New Media. She received an MA in Conflict, Security, and Development from King’s College London and a B.Sc in Accounting from Obafemi Awolowo University.

== Career ==
Ajao intersects Afro-feminism, healing justice, Ubuntu philosophy, critical consciousness, conflict transformation, and neuroscience in her restorative healing work within civil society, queer and feminist spaces in Africa. She was named one of the “10 African scholars to watch” in 2024 by The Africa Report alongside Simukai Chigudu, Satang Nabaneh and Naminata Diabate.

She is the founder and director of Ìmọ́lẹ̀ of Afrika Centre (ìAfrika), where she leads projects that incorporate indigenous healing traditions and ancestral knowledge with contemporary restorative strategies to address intergenerational trauma and strengthen community resilience. She is affiliated with African Leadership Centre, King's College London as a Research associate and an alumna.
