= Hulda Swai =

Tanzanian researcher and professor

Hulda Shaidi Swai
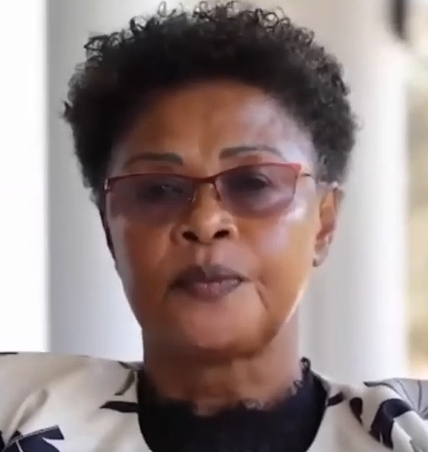
- Born: 1954 (age 71–72); Kilimanjaro Region, Tanganyika Territory
- Education: University of Dar es Salaam (BSc); Queen Mary University of London (MSc, PhD)
- Awards: African Union Kwame Nkrumah Continental Science Award for Scientific Excellence (2020)
- Scientific career
- Fields: Life Sciences; Bioengineering

Hulda Shaidi Swai (born in 1954) is a Tanzanian researcher and professor in life sciences and bioengineering. She is a pioneer in nanomedicine research in the development of drugs against infectious diseases in Africa. Her work focuses in particular on the use of nanotechnology in antimalarial drugs.

== Early life and education ==
Swai was born in 1954 in the village of Vudee in the Same District, Kilimanjaro. She attended secondary schools in the 1970s, and graduated in 1980 from the University of Dar es Salaam with degrees in chemistry and statistics.

In 1985, Swai was awarded a Master of Science in chemical engineering from the Queen Mary University of London. She earned her PhD in biomaterials from the same university in 2000.

== Research and career ==
Swai worked for nine years as a researcher at the Queen Mary University of London.

From 2001 to 2014, she was a researcher at the Council for Scientific and Industrial Research (CSIR) in South Africa. She heads the Department of Science and Technology / Pan-African Center of Excellence for Research and Training in Applied Nanomedicine.

In 2015, she returned to Tanzania and joined the Nelson Mandela African Institution of Science and Technology (NM-AIST) as a professor. She is responsible for leading the NM-AIST's bid for the establishment of a World Bank-funded African Center of Excellence (ACE II project). The NM-AIST was chosen in December 2016 to host two African Centers of Excellence, and she became responsible for the African Center for Research, Agricultural Progress, Excellence in Education and Sustainability (CREATES).

In 2009, Swai joined the Developing Countries Coordinating Committee of the European Developing Countries Clinical Trials Partnership (EDCTP). She also sits on several other international expert committees, such as TB Global Alliance, ISHReCA, UNECA, Erasmus Mundus Nanofar, and the editorial board of the Journal of Nanomedicine.

In 2013, Swai was appointed as an extraordinary professor at the University of Pretoria. In 2019, she became president of the African Materials Research Society (AMRS).

== Works ==
In March 2011, Swai organized the first international workshop on nanomedicine for diseases of poverty, in South Africa.

Swai's research on nanomedicine to improve drugs for tuberculosis and malaria is currently in preclinical development. The Malaria Project at CREATES, launched in 2016, received the equivalent of R110,000,000 (US$6 million) from the World Health Organization as a pilot project to prove the potential of nanomedicine in diagnostics and the treatment of diseases.

== Awards ==
In 2020, Swai became the holder of the Oliver Tambo Chair (OR Tambo Africa Research Chairs Initiative) in nanotechnology in relation to biomedical health and sustainable agriculture.

Swai is the 2020 recipient of the African Union Kwame Nkrumah Award for Scientific Excellence for her work on the use of nanotechnology to study antimalarial drugs.
