= Kelvin Mbilinyi =

Tanzanian musician

- Born: Kelvin Zakayo Mbilinyi; 24 December 1992 (age 33); Iringa, Tanzania
- Other name: Kevoo Hard
- Occupations: Musician, song writer

Kelvin Zakayo Mbilinyi (born 24 December 1992), better known by his pseudonym Kevoo Hard, is a Tanzanian musician.

== Career ==
Mbilinyi is best known for his single Emiwado which was published in 2014. He recorded a single together with Lilian. In his single Love, he combined the languages of Nigeria. He learned the Languages of Nigeria with the help of Nigerian artist and musician Q Chillah (who also appeared in song Love).

== Singles ==
- "Cheza Africa"
- "Love"
- "Kamchezo"
- "Tujidai"
- "Emiwado"
