= LASPNET =

Non governmental organization based in Uganda

Legal Aid service Providers Network (LASPNET) is a non governmental organization based in Uganda.

It is an umbrella organization for several legal Aid clinics in Uganda.

== History ==
LASPNET started in 2001as a coalition to encourage the private sector players to get involved in issues directly affecting the poor and their access to justice in Uganda.

It was registered in 2004 as a company with the aim of promoting access to justice for the vulnerable and marginalized.

== Membership ==
LASPNET is an organization that coordinates other organizations that provide free legal Aid in Uganda.

It has a membership of over 40 nongovernmental organizations including, Uganda Association of Women Lawyers (FIDA-U), Law Development Center's Legal aid clinic (LAC), Makerere University's Public interest law clinic (PILAC), Legal Aid project of Uganda Law society among others.

LASPNET also directly tackles issues of gender based violence, human rights and governance in Uganda.

== Location ==
LASPNET is located on Plot 10, Block 75 off Balintuma Road, Mengo Kampala Uganda.
