= Josephine Chandiru Drama =

South Sudanese human right activist and lawyer

- Citizenship: South Sudan
- Education: Makerere University; Law Development Center
- Occupation: Lawyer Director of Steward Women Organization Human Rights Defender Activist
- Awards: 20 for 20 Solidarity awards 2013/2014 Award recipient of the Women, Peace and Security Fellowship for African Women

Josephine Chandiru Drama is a South Sudanese human rights defender, lawyer, activist, member of the South Sudan Hub, and the director of Steward Women organization an NGO in South Sudan. She campaigned for over 10 years for South Sudan to accept the Maputo Protocol, via Steward women, which was a success, in June 2023, when South Sudan became the 44th African country member.

== Early life and education ==
Drama holds a bachelor's degree in law from Makerere University has a postgraduate diploma in legal practice from the Law Development Center.

== Career ==
Drama, is a lawyer, women's rights activist with more than 10 years of experience on the provision of access to justice for women and girls, director of Steward Women and the chair of the Rule of Law Technical Reference Group of the National Gender-Based Violence (GBV) Sub-Cluster in South Sudan.

She has supported the prosecution of the first child marriage case in South Sudan and is a champion of Maputo Protocol. She is a member of the technical group tasked with bringing the Maputo Protocol into the country.

She was an Assistant Lecturer for Administrative Law at Uganda Christian University, Legal Assistant in M/s Bandaru & Co. Advocates and a Volunteer Legal Officer at FIDA -Uganda.

== Awards and nominations ==
Drama received The 20 for 20 Solidarity awards for leading the acceptance of the Maputo Protocol in South Sudan. She is a 2013/2014 Award recipient of the Women, Peace and Security Fellowship for African Women from the African Leadership Centre/King's College London, UK.
