= Eunice Musiime =

Ugandan lawyer

- Born: 27 July 1979 (age 47); Uganda
- Education: Makerere University
- Occupation: Lawyer
- Known for: Legal advocacy

Eunice Musiime (born 27 July 1979) is a Ugandan lawyer, feminist and development specialist. She is the current Executive Director of Akina Mama wa Afrika. She is also the chairperson of the Uganda Association of Women Lawyers (FIDA-U). On 1 January 2005, she wrote a framework report on Organic Agriculture in Uganda with other two authors, Boaz Keizire and Moses Muwanga.

== Biography ==
Musiime holds a bachelor's degree in Law from the University of Dar es Salaam (Tanzania) and a Master's in Business Administration majoring in public policy analysis from the University of Birmingham.

Between 2004 and 2006, Musiime worked as a research fellow with Advocates Coalition for Development and Environment. She was the head of the department of policy and advocacy at the Uganda Law Society from 2006 to 2010, and chair of FIDA-Uganda from 2014 to 2016. Musiime is currently executive director of Akina Mama wa Afrika.

== Articles ==
- "Unleashing the Leader Within"
- "Organic Agriculture in Uganda: The Need for a Coherent Policy Framework". 1 January 2005
