= Ruge =

Ruge is a German surname. Notable people with the surname include:

- Arnold Ruge (1802–1889), German philosopher
- Arthur Claude Ruge (1905–2000), American engineer and inventor
- Billy Ruge (c. 1866/1870–1955), American actor
- Boris Ruge, German diplomat, former ambassador and NATO official
- Carl Arnold Ruge (1846–1926), German pathologist and primatologist
- Catherine Ruge (born 1982), Tanzanian politician
- Daniel Ruge (1917–2005), American neurosurgeon and White House physician
- Eugen Ruge (born 1954), German writer, director and translator
- Friedrich Ruge (1894–1985), German Navy vizeadmiral awarded the Knight's Cross of the Iron Cross
- Georg Ruge (1852–1919), German anatomist
- George H. Ruge (1921–2011), American radio personality
- Gerd Ruge (1928–2021), German journalist
- Gerd Ruge (soldier) (1913–1997), German World War II soldier awarded the Knight's Cross of the Iron Cross
- Gesine Ruge, German 21st century sprint canoer
- Nina Ruge (born 1956), German journalist
- Otto Ruge (1882-1961), Norwegian general
- Sophus Ruge (1831–1903), German geographer and historian
