= Iringa =

City in Iringa Region, Tanzania

Iringa Lilinga (Hehe)
- City of Iringa Region
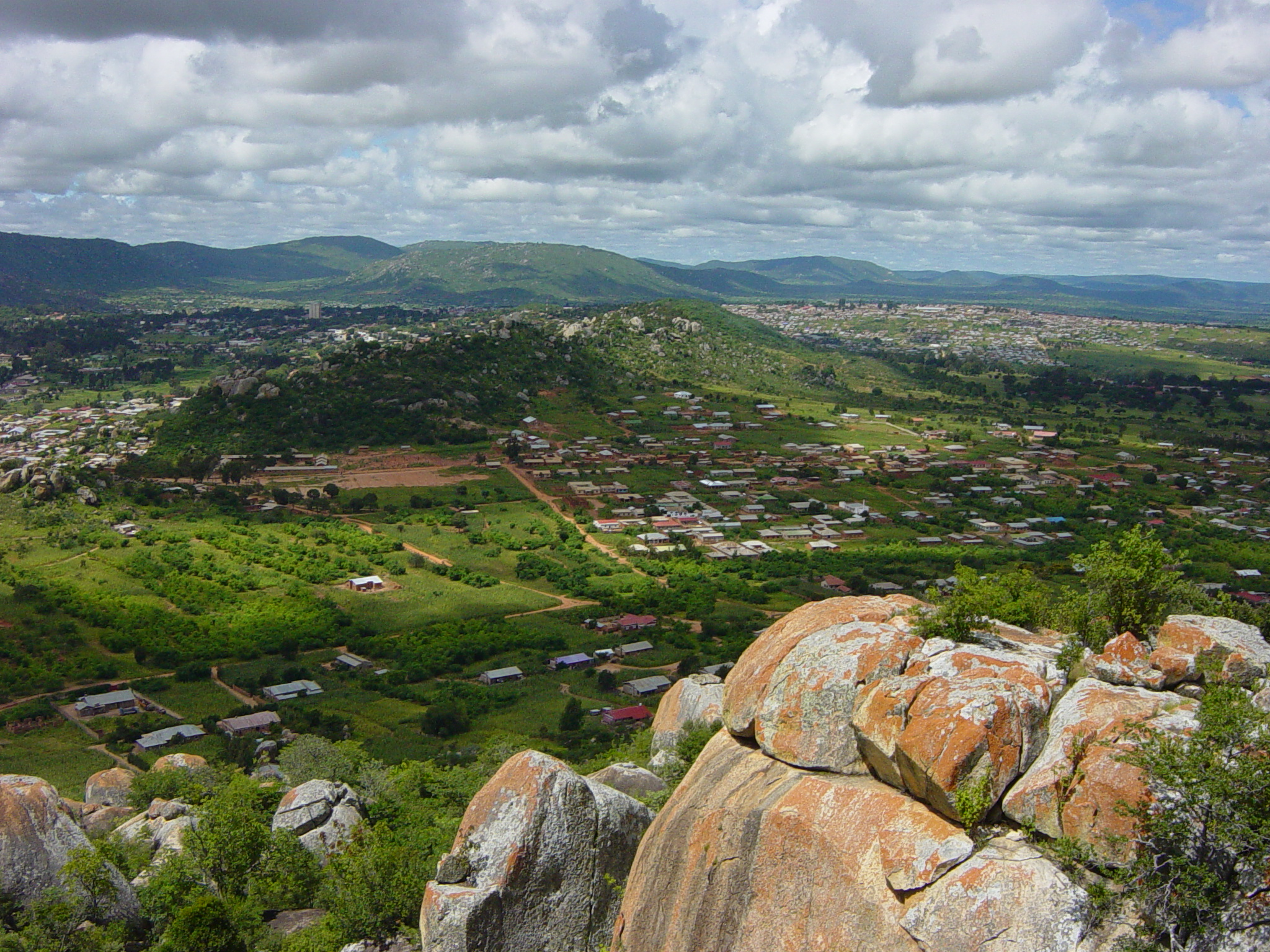
- Hilltop view of Iringa
- Nickname: Home of the Brave
- Location in Tanzania
- Coordinates: 7°46′S 35°42′E
- Country: Tanzania
- Region: Iringa
- District: Iringa Urban

Government
  - Type: Democratic
  - (Member of Parliament): Jesca Msambatavangu
  - Region commissioner: Queen Sendiga
  - District commissioner: Richard Kasesela

Population (2022 census)
  - Total: 202,490
- Time zone: UTC+3 (East Africa Time)
- Climate: BSh

Iringa is a city in Tanzania with a population of 202,490 (as of 2022) and situated at a latitude of 7.77°S and longitude of 35.69°E. The name is derived from the Hehe word lilinga, meaning fort. Iringa is the administrative capital of Iringa Region. Iringa Municipal Council is the administrative designation of the Municipality of Iringa. Iringa has been one of the coldest regions in Tanzania due to its geographical location but that has attracted a lot of tourists from colder regions abroad especially Western Europe. Iringa also hosts one of Africa’s largest national parks the Ruaha National Park.

== Geography ==
The town stretches along a hilltop overlooking the Little Ruaha River to the south, and spreads along ridges and valleys to the north. Iringa is in the Udzungwa Mountains, and the altitude of the town's environs is more than 1,550 metres (5,090 ft) above sea level. The months of June, July, and August can see low temperatures near freezing. The Tanzam Highway passes through the valley below the town; the highway distance from Iringa's limits to Dar es Salaam is 502 kilometers (312 mi), via Morogoro.

=== Climate ===
Iringa has a fairly dry climate with mild-to-warm temperatures year round. Iringa has a wet season from December to April, and a nearly rainless period from June to September. Its climate is classified by Köppen as a hot semi-arid climate (BSh).

Climate data for Iringa (1991–2020)
Month	Jan	Feb	Mar	Apr	May	Jun	Jul	Aug	Sep	Oct	Nov	Dec	Year
Mean daily maximum °C (°F)	26.7 (80.1)	26.9 (80.4)	27.0 (80.6)	26.4 (79.5)	26.2 (79.2)	25.4 (77.7)	24.7 (76.5)	25.7 (78.3)	27.5 (81.5)	28.8 (83.8)	29.4 (84.9)	28.0 (82.4)	26.9 (80.4)
Mean daily minimum °C (°F)	16.7 (62.1)	16.2 (61.2)	15.9 (60.6)	15.7 (60.3)	14.6 (58.3)	13.0 (55.4)	12.4 (54.3)	12.6 (54.7)	13.5 (56.3)	15.0 (59.0)	16.2 (61.2)	16.6 (61.9)	14.9 (58.8)
Average rainfall mm (inches)	147.3 (5.80)	130.2 (5.13)	128.0 (5.04)	57.7 (2.27)	13.1 (0.52)	0.5 (0.02)	0.0 (0.0)	0.0 (0.0)	0.6 (0.02)	4.8 (0.19)	28.0 (1.10)	121.8 (4.80)	632.0 (24.88)
Average rainy days (≥ 1.0 mm)	13.3	10.9	11.7	7.5	2.0	0.1	0.0	0.0	0.1	0.5	2.8	10.4	59.3
Source: NOAA

== History ==
The Isimila Stone Age site, which lies about 20 km (12 mi) to the southwest, contains archeological artifacts, particularly stone tools, from human habitation about 70,000 years ago.

Iringa Region is home to the Hehe people. After their defeat at Lugalo by the Hehe, led by Chief Mkwawa, the Germans built a military station at 'Neu Iringa' to avenge the death of their commander Emil von Zelewski and to teach the Hehe respect for German authority. The fortress and headquarters of Chief Mkwawa was in the nearby village of Kalenga, Alt Iringa.

== Education ==
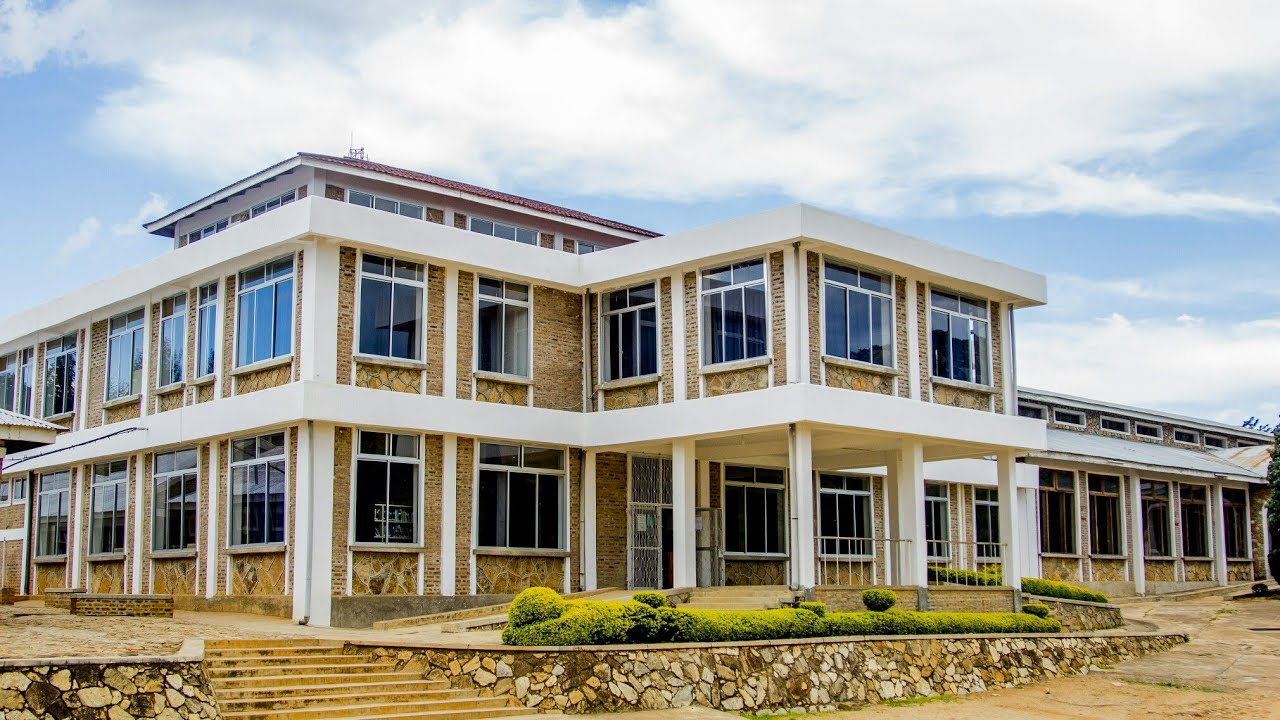
University of Iringa

Iringa has several institutions of higher education, including Tumaini University, Iringa University College, Mkwawa University College of Education (a constituent college of the University of Dar es Salaam), and Ruaha Catholic University (RUCU)). There are also secondary schools like Tosamaganga high school, Malangali high school, Iringa girls' secondary school, Ifunda technical school and Ruaha Secondary School.

== Economy ==
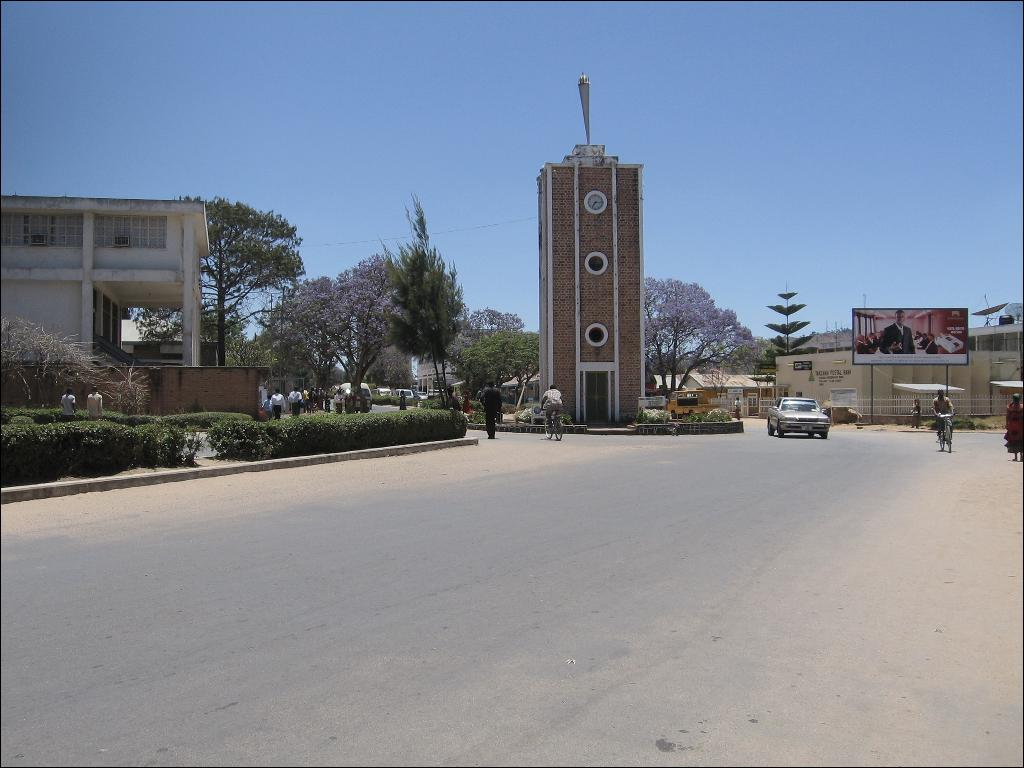
Main road with the clock tower in Iringa city

The trans-African automobile route — the Cairo-Cape Town Highway passes through Iringa. Iringa has a well-established industrial base, including food processing and logistics industries. Most of its electricity comes from the nearby Mtera Dam. Iringa is a minor transport hub for regular bus travelers. It is a center for trucking services to Dar es Salaam, Mbeya, Songea, and Dodoma and other regions of Tanzania. It is also a servicing town for trucks going to neighboring countries such as Zambia, Democratic Republic of Congo, Malawi, Burundi and other EAC countries.

== Crafts ==
Iringa is known for its woven baskets, made from local reeds. The baskets are used across Tanzania and exported internationally. The city is also known for the award-winning Neema Crafts Centre.

== Media ==
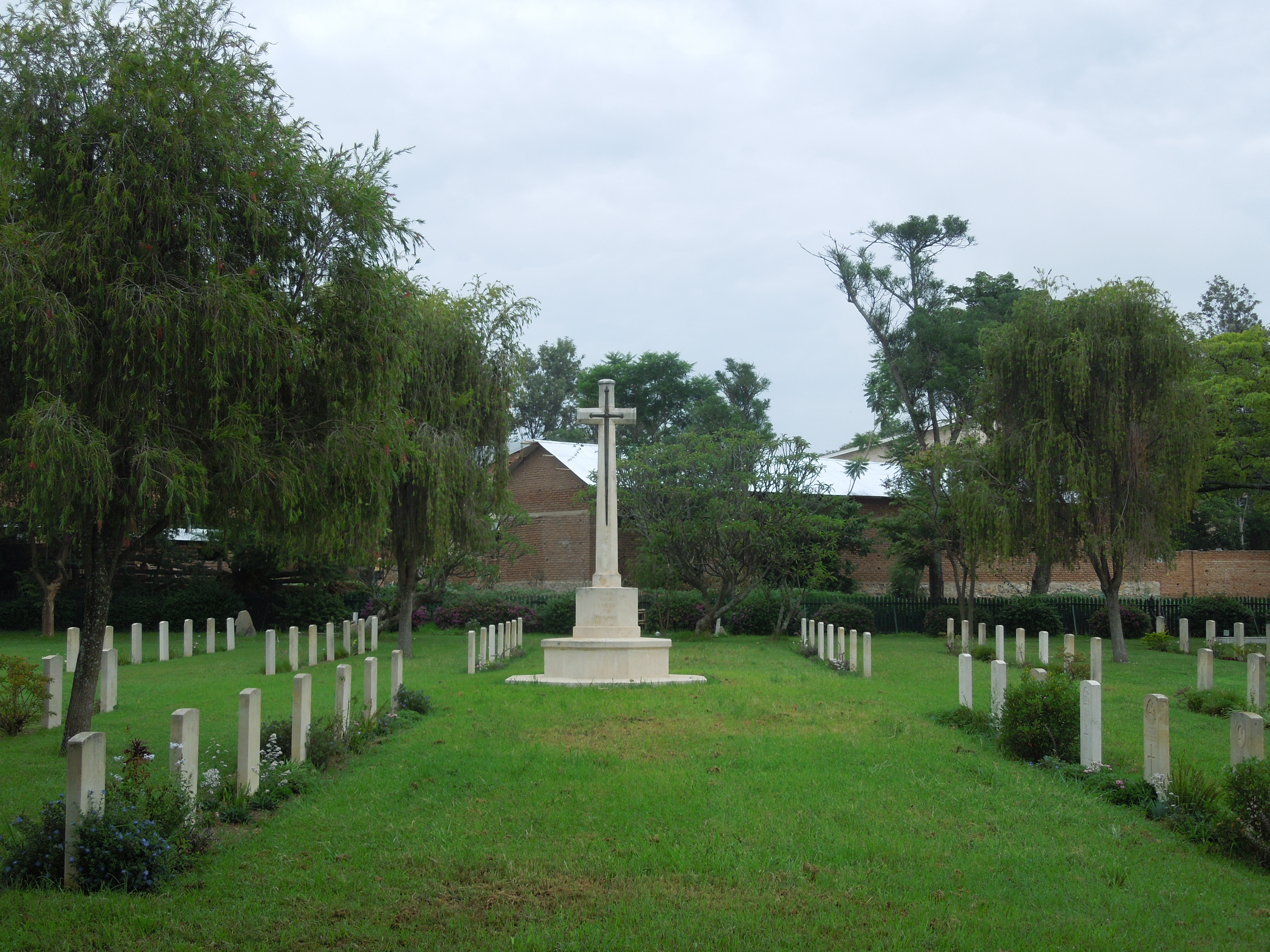
Iringa Commonwealth War Cemetery

Iringa municipality has seven FM radio stations: Trap Gang Radio, Ebony FM, Shamba FM Radio, Nuru FM (youth entertainment and commercial radios), Overcomers Radio and Radio Furaha (Christian stations), Kibra Ten Radio (a Muslim station). There are other radio stations elsewhere in Iringa region, such as Kitulo community radio in Makete and another FM radio station in Njombe.

Iringa has one TV station: Municipal Television, a multi-age TV station with diversified programmes.
