= Same, Tanzania =

Same
- Town
- Location within Tanzania
- Coordinates: 4°4′S 37°47′E
- Country: Tanzania
- Region: Kilimanjaro Region
- District: Same District
- Elevation: 897 m (2,943 ft)

Population (2022 census)
  - Total: 34,322

Same is a town in northern Tanzania near the border with Kenya. In 2012, it had 25,794 inhabitants. Nearby there is the Mkomazi National Park. Same is the district capital of Same District.

== Transport ==
It is served by a station on the Tanga line of the national railway network. The station has been dormant since the stopping of railway services. However the main road T2 from Dar es Salaam to Arusha passes through the town. There is a bus stop for all major bus companies driving to cities of dar es salaam, Moshi and Arusha. There is also an aerodrome for small planes.

== See also ==
- Railway stations in Tanzania
