= Hehe language =

Bantu language

Hehe
- Kihehe
- Native to: Tanzania
- Ethnicity: Hehe
- Native speakers: 1,200,000 (2016)
- Language family: Niger–Congo?: Atlantic–Congo; Benue–Congo; Southern Bantoid; Bantu; Northeast Bantu; Bena–Kinga (G60); Hehe

Language codes
- ISO 639-3: heh
- Glottolog: hehe1240
- Guthrie code: G.62
- Linguasphere: 99-AUS-ua

Hehe, also known by its native name Kihehe [kihehe], is a Bantu language that is spoken by the Hehe people of the Iringa region of Tanzania, lying south of the Great Ruaha River. In the 1970s, it was estimated that 190,000 people spoke Hehe. A more recent estimate puts the number at 1,200,000. There has been some Bible translation (British and Foreign Bible Society). Hehe may be mutually intelligible with Bena.

There are four main dialects: Kalenga (in the centre of the region, north-west and west of Iringa), Koisamba (in the Rift Valley to the north-west), Sungwa (east of Iringa round the Udzungwa Mountains), and Mufindi (south of Iringa). Among other differences, Sungwa has sounds /t͡s/ and /d͡z/ which are absent from other dialects.

== Grammar ==
Hehe has 15 noun classes, marked with prefixes. The language has a complex tense-aspect-mood system.

== Phonology ==
=== Consonants ===
		Labial	Alveolar	Palatal	Velar	Glottal
Nasal		m	n	ɲ	ŋ	
Stop/ Affricate	voiceless	p	t	t͡ʃ	k	
Stop/ Affricate	implosive	ɓ	ɗ	ʄ	ɠ	
Stop/ Affricate	prenasal	ᵐb	ⁿd	ⁿdʑ	ᵑɡ	
Fricative	voiceless	f	s			h
Fricative	voiced		(z)			
Fricative	prenasal		ⁿz			
Approximant		ʋ	l	j	w	

==== Stops and affricates ====
- In the "stop/affricate" group, /t͡ʃ/ and /ⁿdʑ/ are described by Nyamahanga as affricates, the others being stops. /t͡ʃ/ is described as palato-alveolar, and /ⁿdʑ/ as palatal.

==== Prenasalised consonants ====
- The five prenasalised consonants (/ᵐb/, /ⁿd/, /ⁿdʑ/, /ᵑɡ/, /ⁿz/) are voiced but not implosive. If they are preceded by a vowel, the vowel is usually (but not always) long.
- When an implosive consonant is preceded by a nasal prefix such as N- 'I, me', the prefix assimilates with the following consonant and changes it to the appropriate prenasalised consonant; e.g. ku-ɗeta 'to lie' when preceded by N- changes to ⁿdeta 'I'll lie'; ku-ɠeːⁿda 'to walk' changes to ᵑgeːⁿda 'I'll walk'.
- The combination of N- + a voiceless stop, however, does not result in a prenasalised consonant but a simple nasal, e.g. ku-pepa 'to smoke' becomes mepa 'I'll smoke'.
- The voiced labial-velar approximant /w/ changes to /ᵐbʷ/ when nasalised, e.g. ku-weːⁿda 'to like' > ᵐbʷeːⁿda 'I'll like'.
- The phoneme /ʋ/ is described by Nyamahanga as a labio-dental approximant. When nasalised it becomes ᵐb, e.g. ku-ʋalila 'to count' > ᵐbalila 'I'll count'. It cannot be followed by the vowel /o/ but changes to /w/ in this situation.
- The labio-dental fricative /f/ when preceded by nasal N either changes to /ʋ/ or remains as /f/; in either case the nasal is dropped, e.g. ku-fika 'to arrive' > ʋika or fika 'I'll arrive'.
- The lateral approximant /l/ changes to /ⁿd/ when prenasalised, e.g. ku-lima 'to till' > ⁿdima 'I'll till'.

==== Consonants with glide ====
- Most consonants (with the exception of /ʋ/, /j/, and /w/) can be labialised, that is, followed by a glide [w]. Nyamahanga treats these labialised consonants as separate phonemes to the unlabialised consonants. Labialised consonants tend to be followed by a long vowel, except in the final syllable of a word, e.g. muhʷeːhʷe 'fear'.
- Most consonants (with the exception of /w/, /j/, /k/, /ɠ/, /ŋ/, /s/, /h/) can be followed by the glide vowel [j] ⟨y⟩ in the same way. In situations where /ki/ and /ɠi/ might be expected to form a glide vowel, they are transformed into the phonemes /t͡ʃ/ and /ʄ/: e.g. ki- (class 7 prefix) + uɠípa 'sharpen' becomes ʧ-uːɠípa 'it will sharpen', with compensatory lengthening of the vowel.

==== Other consonants ====
- [z] occurs in the language, but is mainly heard in Swahili loanwords.

=== Vowels ===
	Front	Central	Back
High	i iː		u uː
Mid	e eː		o oː
Low		a aː	

In addition to these ten vowels, Kihehe also has a syllabic /m̩/ (sometimes pronounced [mu] by some speakers). This can occur initially, medially, or finally, and can bear a tone, e.g. ḿtalám̩ 's/he is a tough person' (four syllables, with a high tone on the first and third). Unlike the nasal in the nasalised consonants, this syllabic /m̩/ does not assimilate to the following consonant or cause a following implosive consonant to become plosive.

=== Syllable structure ===
Apart from /m̩/, and the fact that words may begin with a vowel, every syllable in Kihehe consists of the form C(G)V, where C = consonant, V = vowel (long or short), and G = glide (/w/ or /j/). Two different vowels normally cannot follow each other. When a prefix such as tu- 'we' is added to a verb starting with a vowel, the vowels are combined into one syllable; e.g. tu + íᵐba becomes tʷíːᵐba 'we will sing', with lengthening of the /i/ to compensate for the shortening of the /u/. An exception is the prefix ĕː (rising tone), which is added to 3rd person singular verbs without assimilation of the vowels, e.g. ĕː-alyá 's/he would have eaten'.

=== Tones ===
Like most Bantu languages, Kihehe is a tone language. Tones can have both a lexical function (distinguishing one word from another) and a grammatical function (distinguishing different forms of the same verb).

There are two levels of tones, high (H) and low (L). A non-final syllable with a short vowel can be either H or L. If a syllable with a long vowel has a tone, it will have either a rising tone (LH) or a falling one (HL). If a final syllable has a tone, it is always a falling tone.

As in other Bantu languages, the H and L tones are asymmetrical. When two H tones come together, the second H tone is lost and becomes L (see Meeussen's rule). A noun with three syllables usually has only one H tone, but nouns with more than three syllables can have more than one H tone.
