= Mwembe =

Ward in Same District, Kilimanjaro Region

Mwembe Ward Kata ya Mwembe (Swahili)
- Ward
- Kata ya Mwembe, Wilaya ya Same
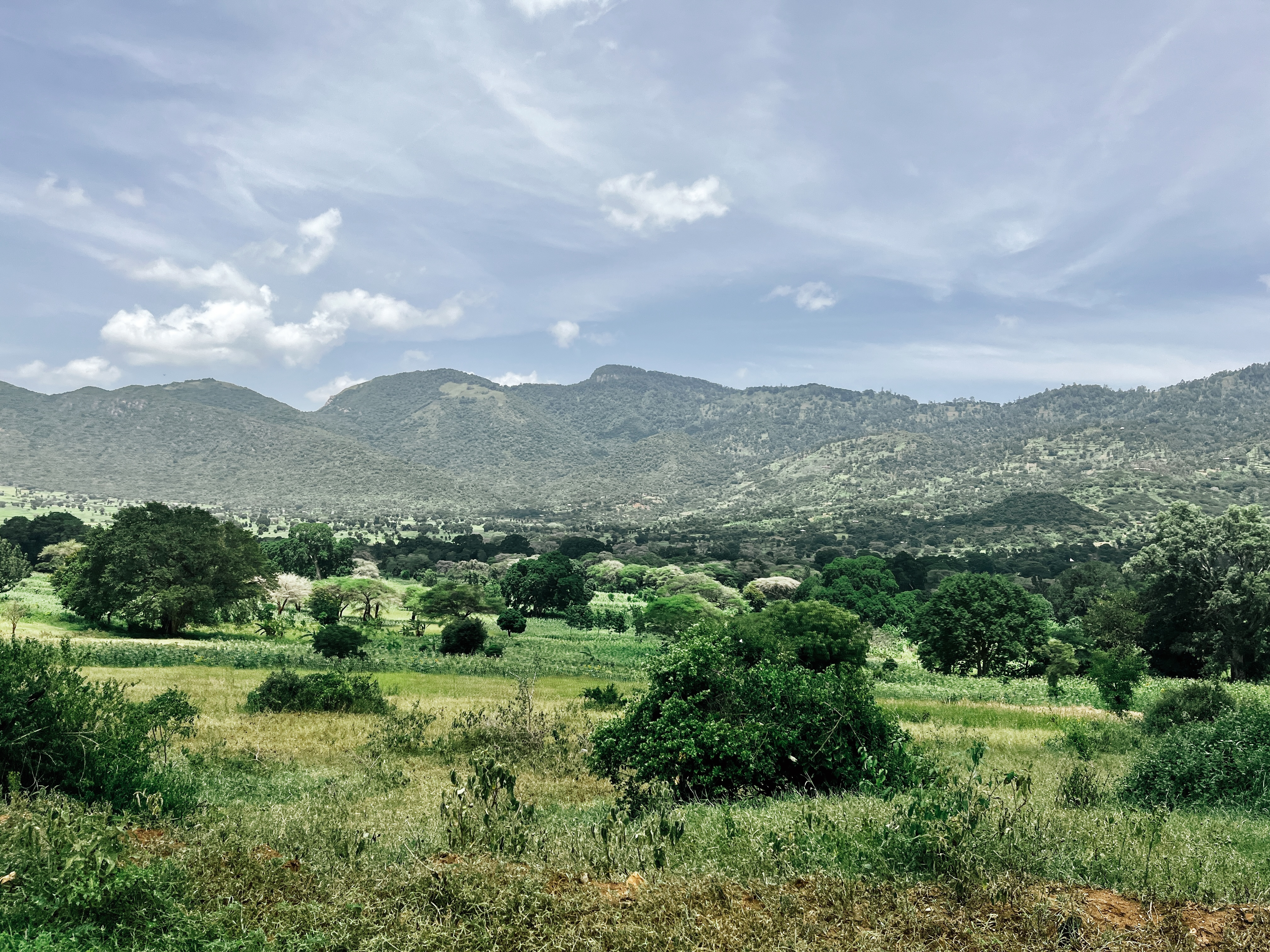
- Landscape in Mwembe Ward, Same District

- Location within Tanzania
- Country: Tanzania
- Region: Kilimanjaro Region
- District: Same District

Area
  - Total: 334.5 km^{2} (129.2 sq mi)
- Elevation: 1,034 m (3,392 ft)

Population (2012)
  - Total: 11,913
  - Density: 35.61/km^{2} (92.24/sq mi)

Mwembe is an administrative ward in Same District of Kilimanjaro Region in Tanzania. The ward covers an area of 334.5 km^{2} (129.2 sq mi), and has an average elevation of 1,034 m (3,392 ft). According to the 2012 census, the ward has a total population of 11,913.
