= Mkwawa University College of Education =

College in Tanzania

Coordinates: 7°45′45″S 35°41′12″E

- Swahili: Chuo Kikuu Kishiriki cha Elimu Mkwawa
- Former names: Mkwawa High School
- Motto: Advancing quality in education, promoting change
- Type: Public
- Established: 2005; 21 years ago
- Chancellor: H.E Dr Jakaya Mrisho Kikwete ( The former President of the United Republic of Tanzania, 2005-2015)
- Vice-Chancellor: Prof. William A. L Anangisye
- Principal: Prof. Deusdedith A.Rwehumbiza
- Location: Iringa, Tanzania
- Campus: Urban
- Constituent college of: University of Dar es Salaam
- Colours: Blue
- Website: University website

The Mkwawa University College of Education (MUCE) is a constituent college of the University of Dar es Salaam in Iringa, Tanzania. The College was established in 2005 following the upgrading of the former Mkwawa High School in response to the growing demand for teachers in the country. Since its establishment in 2005, MUCE has achieved various remarkable milestones, including the increase in students’ enrolment, number of both academic and administrative staff along with their notable development to Master's and PhD levels. Moreover, the College has undergone massive infrastructural development and established various postgraduate programmes namely; Postgraduate Diploma in Education (PGDE) which is offered by the Faculty of Education, Master of Science with Education (M.Sc.Ed) by the Faculty of Science and Master of Arts with Education (M.A.Ed) offered by the Faculty of Humanities and Social Sciences. More efforts are under way to establish more postgraduate programmes at Master's level and their effective implementation from the academic year 2019/2020.
