= Kisiwani, Kilimanjaro =

Ward in Same District, Kilimanjaro Region

Kisiwani Ward Kata ya Kisiwani (Swahili)
- Ward
- Kata ya Kisiwani, Wilaya ya Same
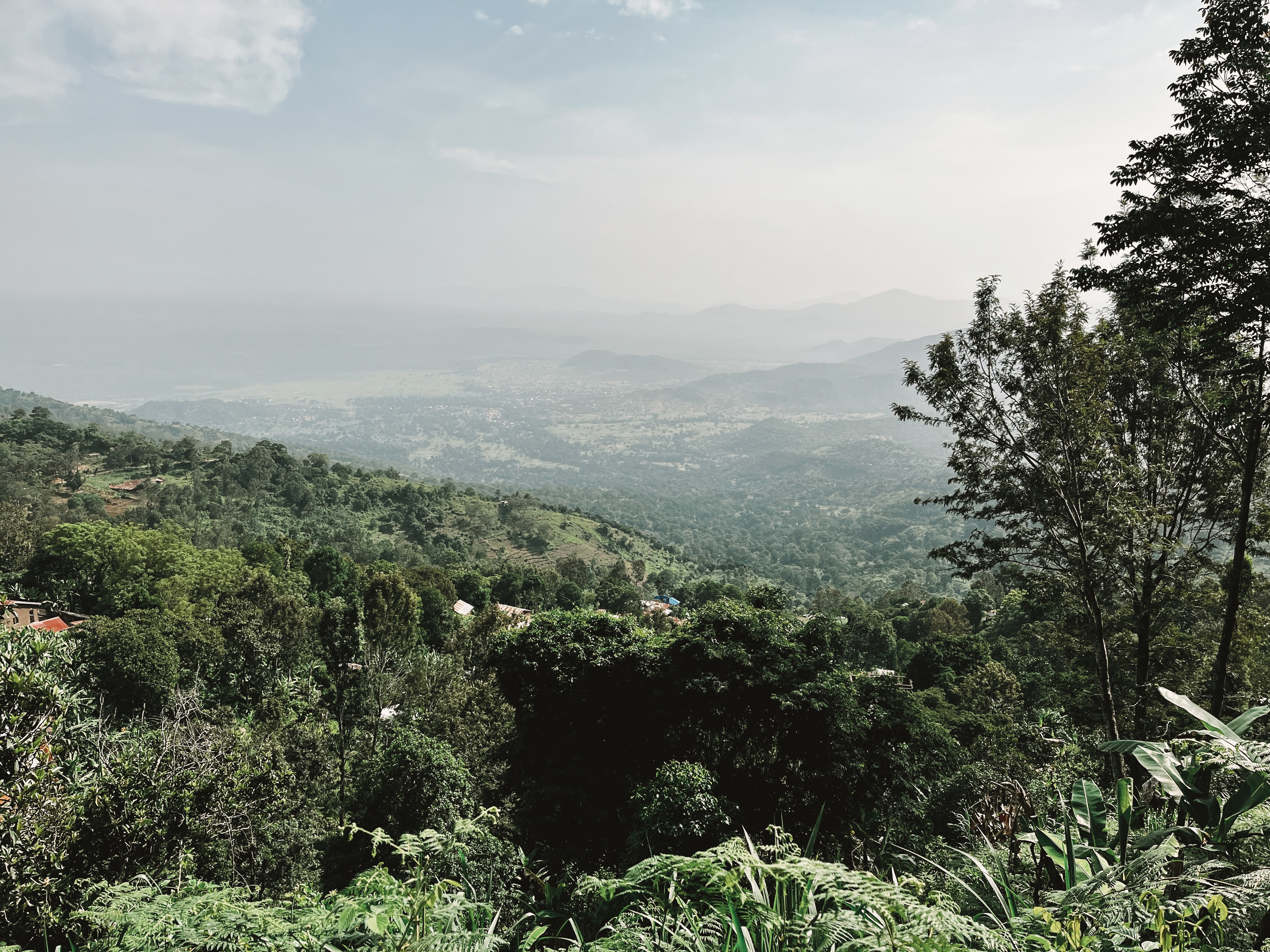
- View of Kiswani Town, Kisiwani ward, Same District

- Location within Tanzania
- Country: Tanzania
- Region: Kilimanjaro Region
- District: Same District

Area
  - Total: 1,538 km^{2} (594 sq mi)
- Elevation: 656 m (2,152 ft)

Population (2012)
  - Total: 9,309
  - Density: 6.053/km^{2} (15.68/sq mi)

Kisiwani is an administrative ward in Same District of Kilimanjaro Region in Tanzania. The ward covers an area of 1,538 km^{2} (594 sq mi), and has an average elevation of 656 m (2,152 ft). According to the 2012 census, the ward has a total population of 9,309.
