= Mshewa =

Ward in Same District, Kilimanjaro Region, Tanzania

Mshewa Ward Kata ya Mshewa (Swahili)
- Ward
- Kata ya Mshewa, Wilaya ya Same
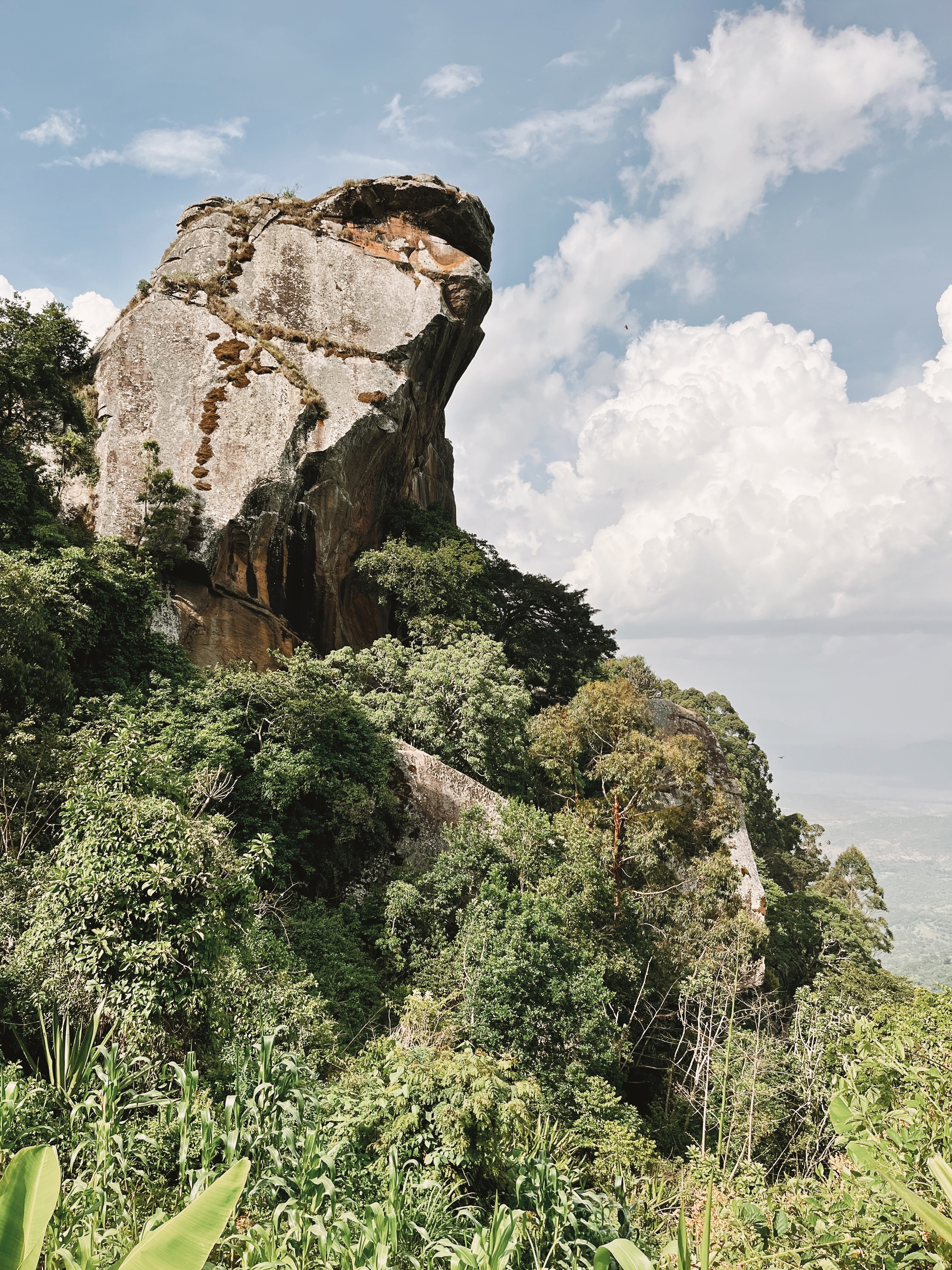
- Malameni Rock, Mshewa Ward, Same

- Location within Tanzania
- Country: Tanzania
- Region: Kilimanjaro Region
- District: Same District

Area
  - Total: 34.5 km^{2} (13.3 sq mi)
- Elevation: 1,221 m (4,006 ft)

Population (2012)
  - Total: 6,154
  - Density: 178/km^{2} (462/sq mi)

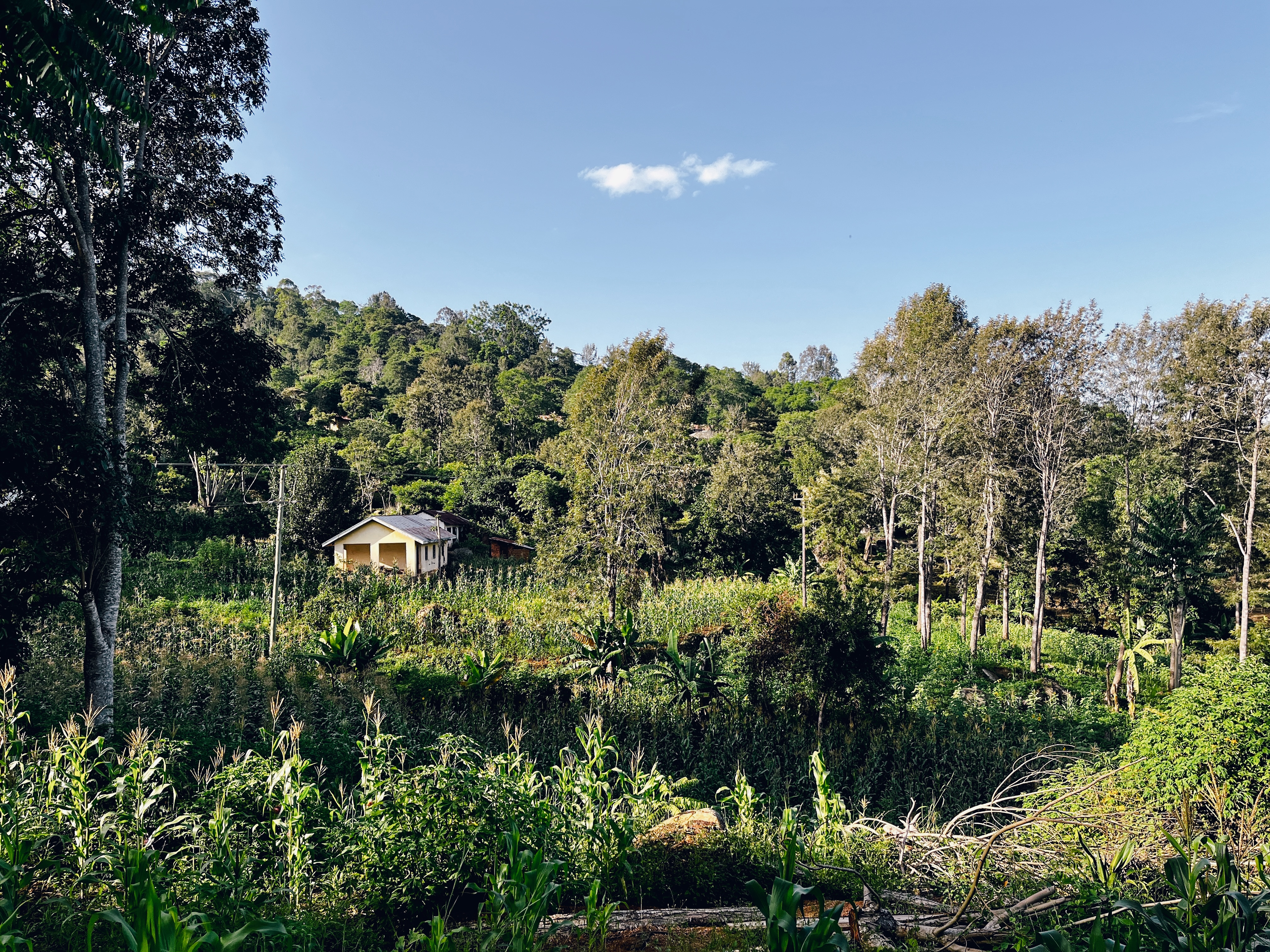
Landscape in Mshewa Ward

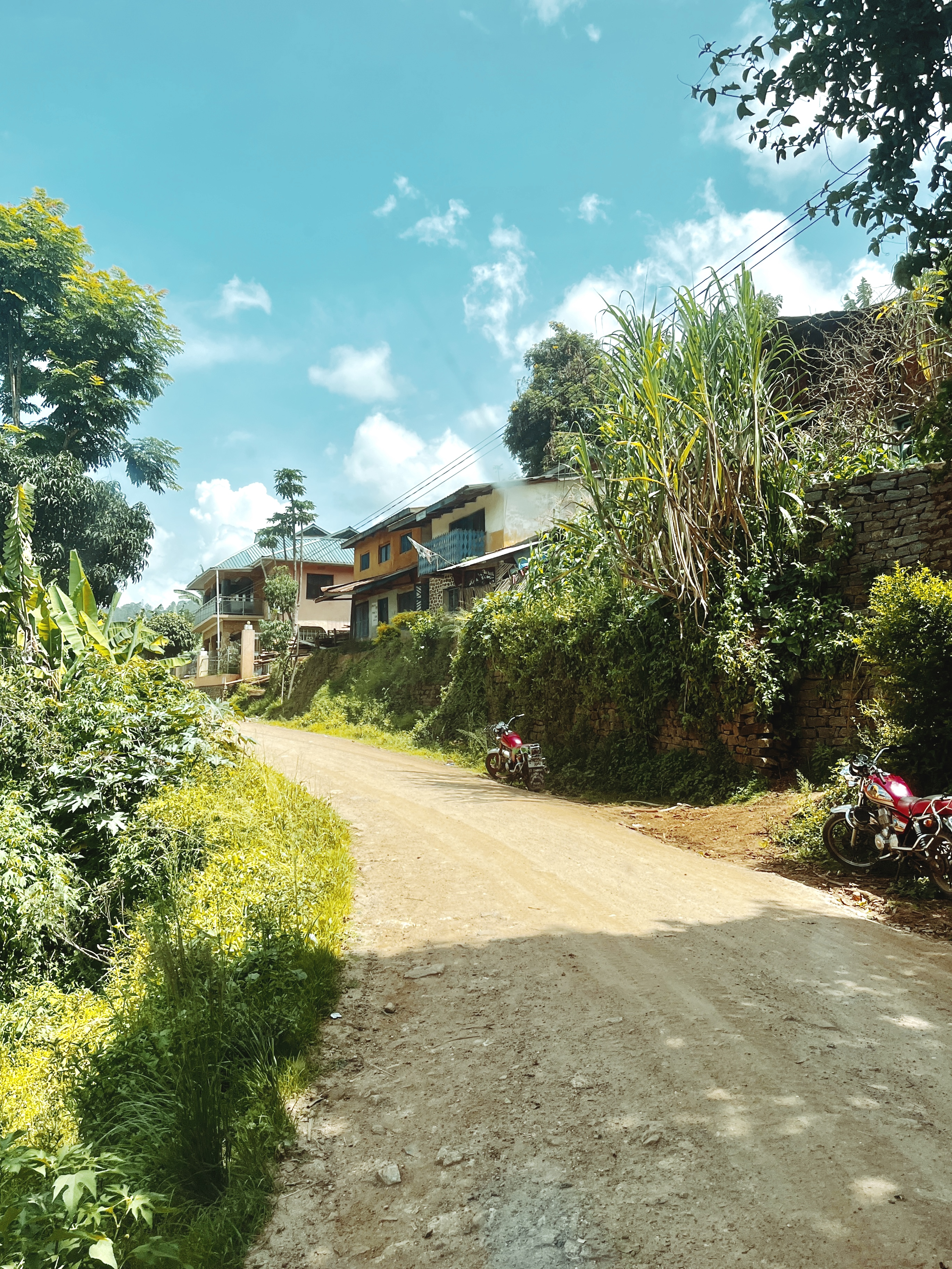
Mbaga-Manka Village, Mshewa Ward, Same

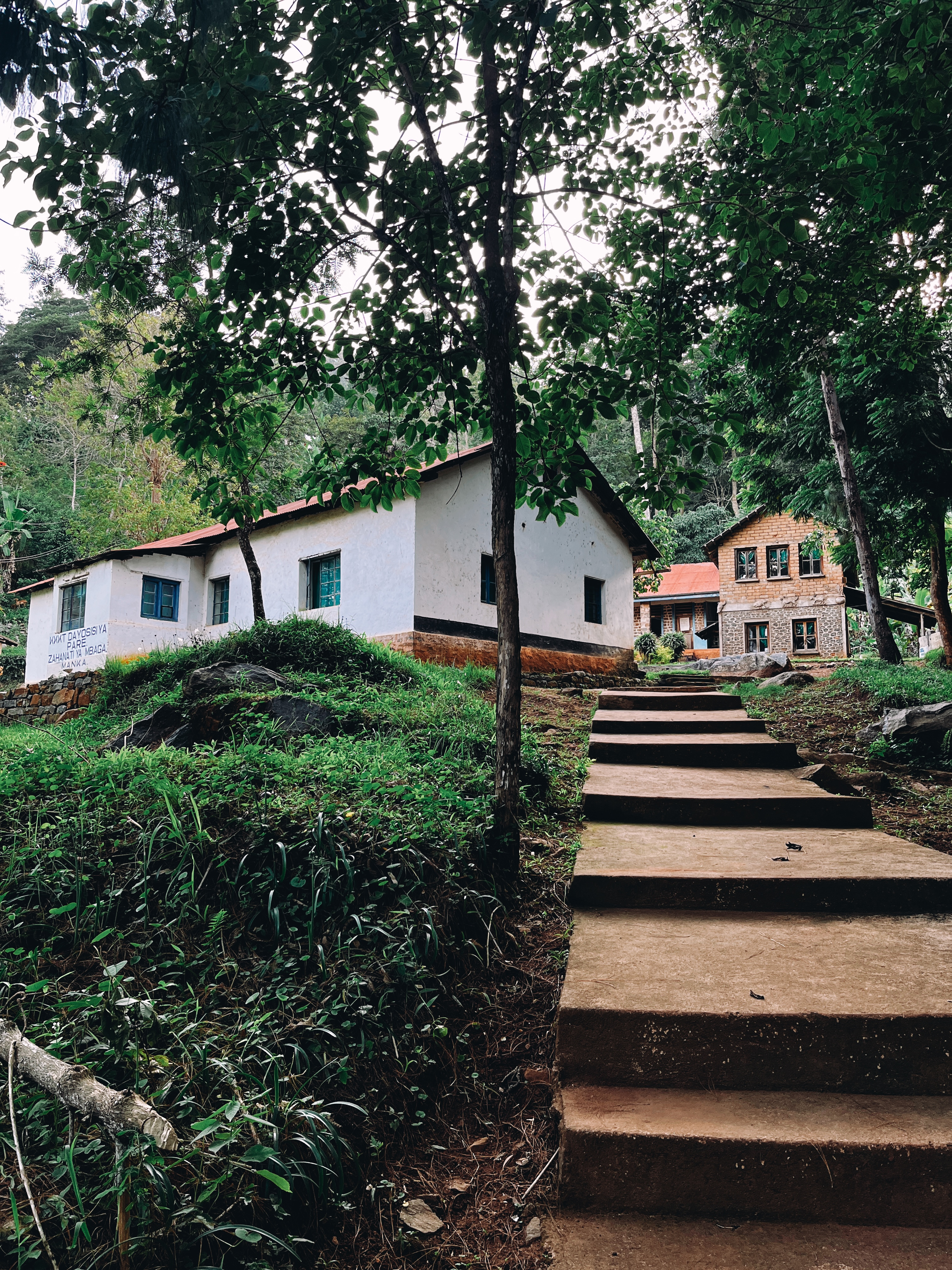
Mbaga-Manka Health Clinic, Mshewa Ward, Same

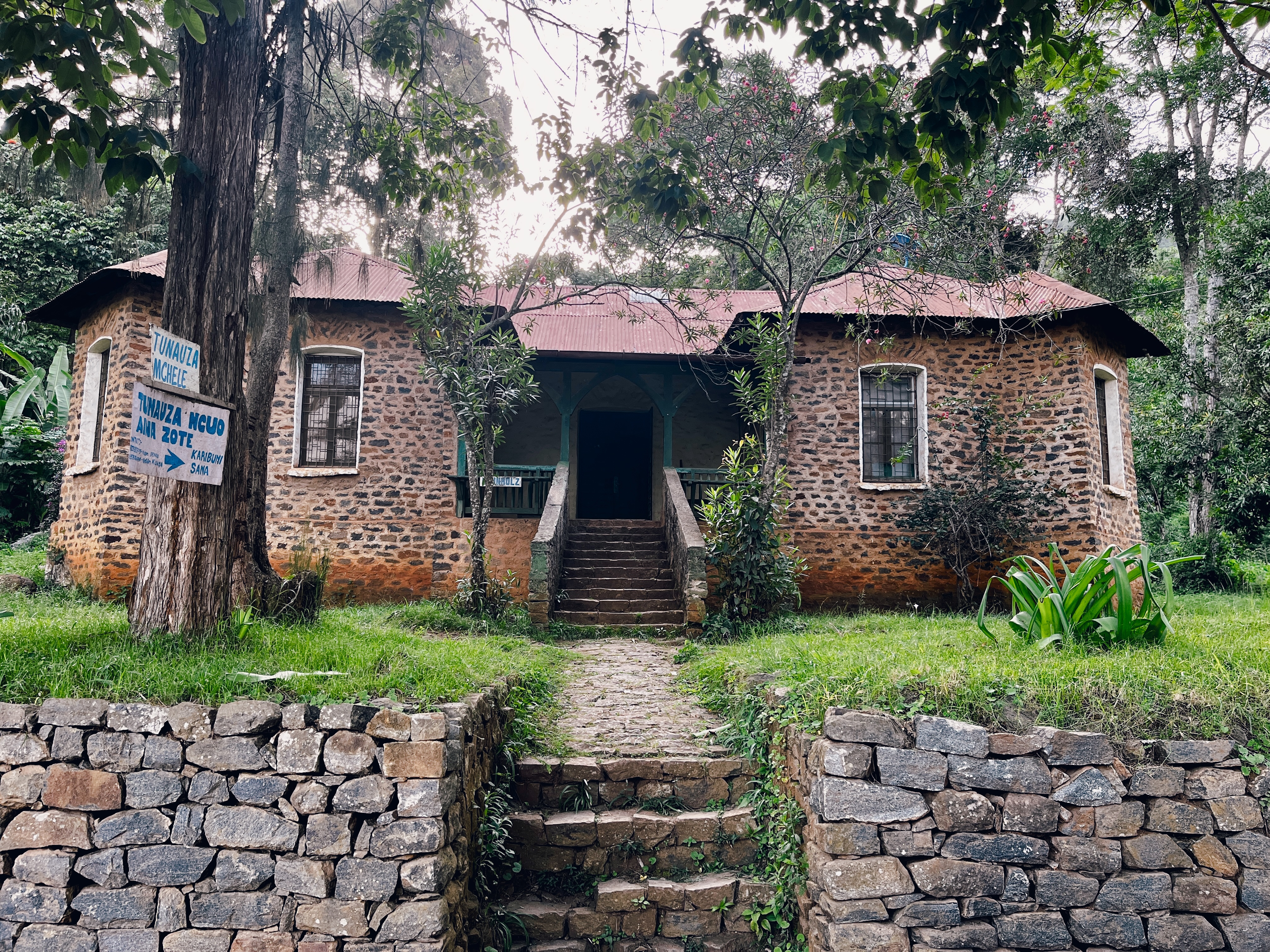
German Missionary House, Mshewa Ward, Same

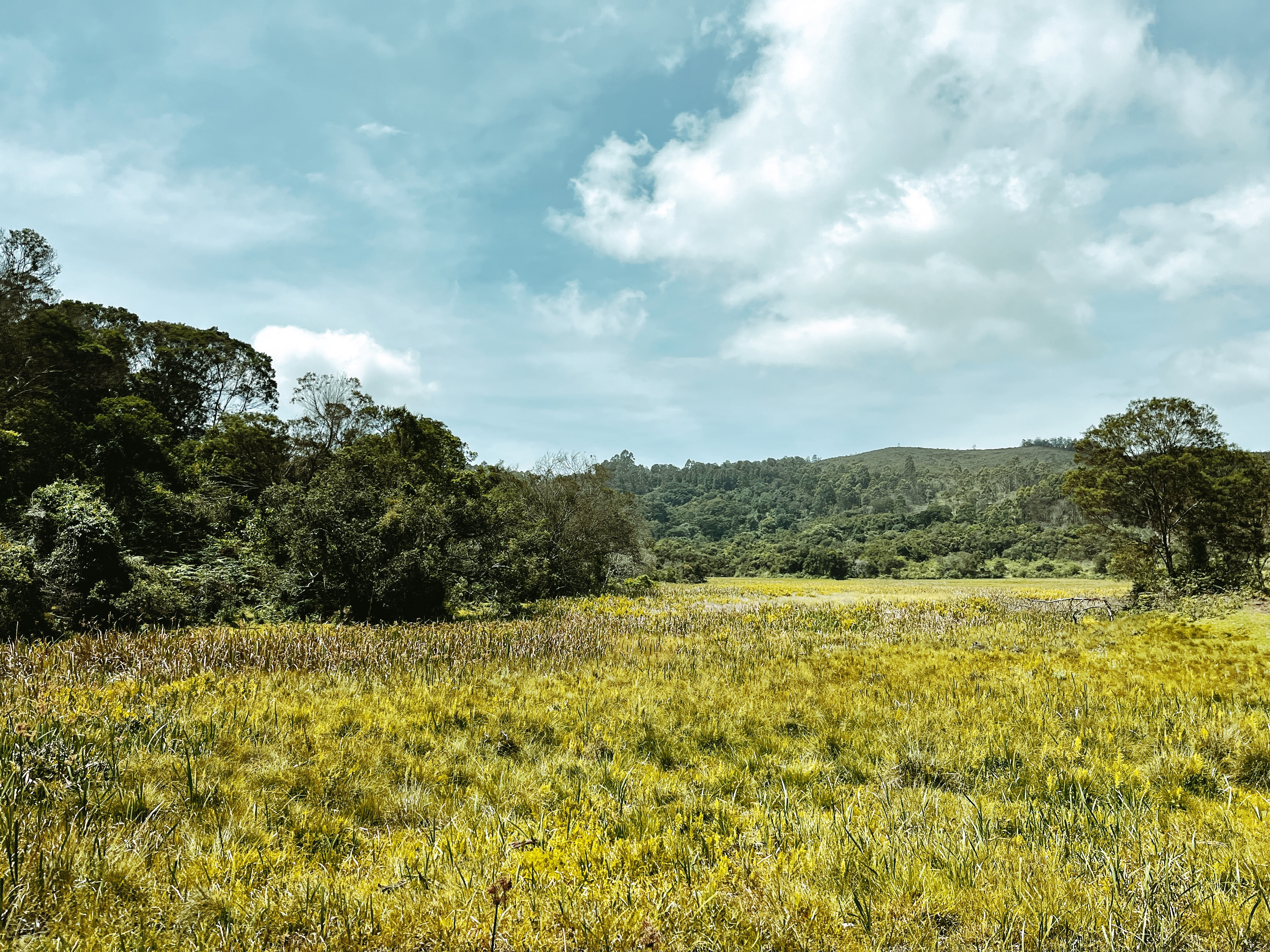
Tona Moorlands, Mshewa Ward, Same

Mshewa is an administrative ward in Same District of Kilimanjaro Region in Tanzania. The ward covers an area of 34.5 km^{2} (13.3 sq mi), and has an average elevation of 1,221 m (4,006 ft). According to the 2012 census, the ward has a total population of 6,154.
