= Christine Butegwa =

Ugandan writer and activist

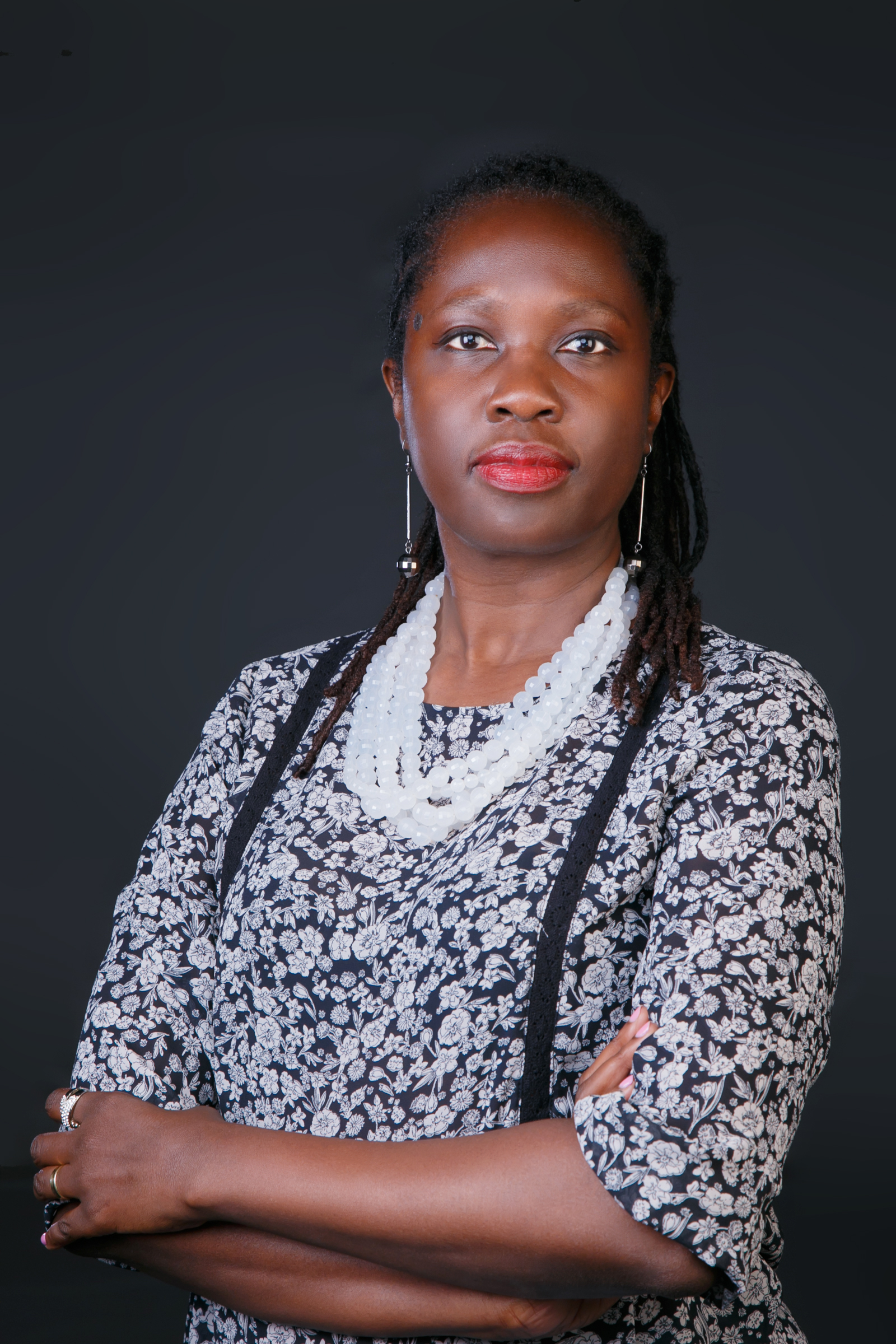
- Citizenship: Ugandan
- Occupations: Feminist, writer, entrepreneur, and gender and development activist
- Website: https://www.jabaliconsulting.com/

Christine Butegwa is a feminist, writer, entrepreneur, and gender and development activist based in Uganda. She is the author of the book titled, "The Mighty Angwech and More: Female Legends from Ugandan folklore". Christine is an interior designer and was the director of Rukundo Design Décor. In 2002, she co-produced a video, "A Tale of Ten Years: The Experience of Women and Gender Studies, Makerere University with Murerwa Rian". She is currently the founder and CEO of Jabali Consulting Ltd, a pan African gender and development consulting firm based in Kampala, Uganda. She is also on the Board of Directors for Art+Feminism.

== Work experience ==
She worked with Akina Mama wa Afrika (AMwA) as the Africa Regional Coordinator. She later served as the acting executive director at AMwA. She also served as the Gender, Rights and Advocacy Advisor at the International Planned Parenthood Federation (IPPF) Africa Regional Office based in Nairobi, Kenya. She was employed at the African Women's Development and Communication Network (FEMNET). Her key areas of interests are women's human rights, gender and development, and communications.

While at AMwA, she, on behalf of the organisation, was in opposition of the Anti gay bill of Uganda.

== See also ==
- International Planned Parenthood Federation
- FEMNET
- Akina Mama wa Afrika
