= University of Dar es Salaam =

University in Tanzania

Coordinates: 6°46′50″S 39°12′12″E

- Chuo Kikuu cha Dar es Salaam (Swahili)
- Former names: University College, Dar es Salaam
- Motto: Hekima ni Uhuru (Swahili)
- Motto in English: Wisdom is Freedom
- Type: Public
- Established: 1970; 56 years ago
- Parent institution: Formerly the University of London and the University of East Africa
- Affiliations: AAU, ACU, IAU
- Chancellor: Jakaya Mrisho Kikwete
- Vice-Chancellor: Professor William-Andey Anangisye
- Academic staff: 1,270
- Administrative staff: 1,023
- Students: 44,650
- Undergraduates: 41,650
- Postgraduates: 3,000
- Location: Sam Nujoma Road, Ubungo, Ubungo District, Dar es Salaam, Tanzania
- Campus: Urban
- Website: www.udsm.ac.tz
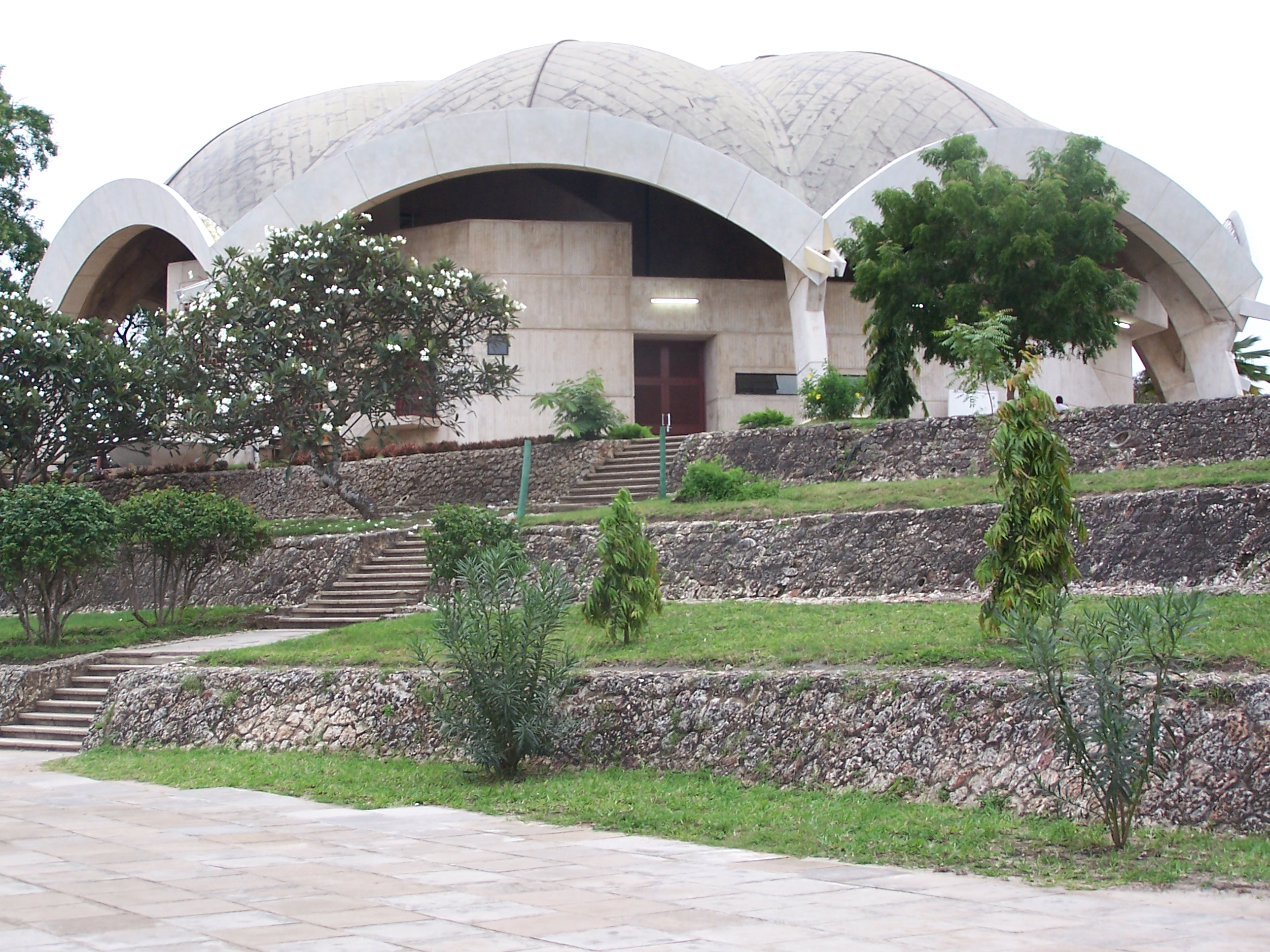

The University of Dar es Salaam (UDSM; Swahili: Chuo Kikuu cha Dar es Salaam) is a public university located in Ubungo District, in the Dar es Salaam Region of Tanzania. It was established in 1961 as an affiliate college of the University of London and became an affiliate of the University of East Africa (UEA) in 1963, shortly after Tanganyika gained its independence from the United Kingdom. In 1970, UEA split into three independent universities: Makerere University in Uganda, the University of Nairobi in Kenya, and the current University of Dar es Salaam in Tanzania.

== History ==
=== Affiliate college of the University of London ===
The university was originally created as the University College Dar es Salaam, an affiliate college of the University of London on October 25, 1961. The university was briefly located on Tanganyika African National Union (TANU) premises on Lumumba street, Dar es Salaam. The university would eventually move to its current location on the hill in the Ubungo district in 1964, after becoming a part of the University of East Africa. It initially only had the faculty of law with fourteen students of which one was female.

=== Affiliate of the University of East Africa ===
In June 1963, the British created the University of East Africa by combining the recently established universities of University College Nairobi, University College Dar es Salaam, and Makerere University College. The University of East Africa was an externally independent college of the University of London. The consolidation of the three colleges were based on the inter-territorial principles of the Asquith commission, designed to create a new class of educated African elites. The three colleges were not equal in size and facilities, causing a desire to expand from Dar es Salaam and Nairobi. The development committee tried to balance the inequities by establishing small Faculties of Art and Science at both Dar es Salaam and Nairobi. However, Makerere was receiving an expanded medical program, and Nairobi was establishing a wide range of professional degrees in commerce and engineering. Tanzanians were outraged at the perceived favoritism towards the universities in the other areas, and Nyerere wanted to foster socialist ideas at the university differing from the perspective of the other countries. Due to the ongoing disagreement in education and regional tension, the university came to an end after a new report released in 1969 by the Commission on Higher Education that stated that the individual universities should be national universities.

=== University of Dar Es Salaam ===
The University Of Dar es Salaam became the first national university of Tanzania on July 1, 1970. The university became more selective, and they created courses to fit the needs of the nation. The university grew to six department of study. The university did not only develop academically and physically, it also developed a socialist ideology in line with TANU. Julius Nyerere believed that the university was not only an opportunity for the select few, but it came with responsibilities and duties to the nation. In March 1967, a conference was held to discuss how to tie the university more inline with the Arusha Declaration. This resulted in the creation of a TANU youth league on campus, less overseas faculty, and the mandatory course of Development Studies. These reforms and the change in the city of Dar es Salaam helped to cement the university as one of the capitals of revolution in Africa. People like Museveni attracted by the ideological element came to the university to study and form hard left student groups on campus establishing a powerful leftist minority in the university. Despite the creation of a socialist environment, TANU wanted to control the university fully and with Nyerere's installment as chancellor of the university; he solidified TANU socialism in the university and weakened far left student organizations outside TANU. These attempts to control the university caused an eventual decline in socialist thought on campus, and by 1985 when Nyerere resigned the ideology had become faded on campus.

=== 1980s-1990s ===
As the university entered the 80s things had begun to change as the environment in east Africa was completely different compare to only a decade ago. Tanzania was fighting a war against Idi Amin in Uganda, the increase in petroleum prices, and the fall in agricultural prices had massive impacts on the country and in turn the university. The university was faced with issues of financial constraints, many high level staff and professors left, and lacked autonym as an institution. The government had a declining revenue, which caused a decline in academic fellowships but the university was still faced with an increase in demand for education.

The country of Tanzania was faced with the same issues as many other Africans country of satisfying donor demands to keep the aid funding the nation flowing. These demands required most of the aid to go towards primary education and leaving little for tertiary education. The university was forced to change its financial and management policies through policies such as the Institutional Transformation Program (ITP), ITP was broadly some guidelines the university followed. One of the policies under the ITP was the reinstatement of cost sharing, a policy where students and parents were gradually reintroduce to the idea of paying for college, which was originally phased out in 1967 when the university decided to offer scholarships to all admitted students.

The new policy was faced with massive backlash from students. They formed a mob decrying the policy and threw stones at the home of the chief academic officer. They even kidnapped the Chief Academic Officer, trying to force her to not pass the policy. Cost sharing was passed, which caused the university to create methods for the students to pay for their education, including student loans. The university also started to utilize donor funding and foreign funding to increase its departments, buildings, and overall academic excellence. During that period external funding amounted to 40% of the university'sincome.

=== Technologies ===
As the university marches forward towards the new millennium, the university started to incorporate more technology into the school. The university made improvements in the infrastructure to allow for the installation of fiber cables, which connected the university to the internet in 2008. They first implemented blackboards in 1998, which was replaced by Moodle in 2008. The integration of Moodle allowed the university to create blended distance programs for postgraduate degrees in education and engineering management. The university created a center for virtual learning to help ensure the quality of the blended distance programs.

== Rankings ==
In 2012, the University Ranking by Academic Performance Center ranked the University of Dar es Salaam as the 1,618th best university in the world (out of 2,000 ranked universities).

In 2013, AcademyRank ranked the university as the 9,965th best university worldwide (out of 9,803 ranked universities) but the best of the 16 ranked in Tanzania, with the Sokoine University of Agriculture in second place.

In 2012, the Scimago Institutions Rankings placed the university in 3,021st place worldwide (out of 3,290 ranked institutions), 57th in Africa, and second in Tanzania behind the Muhimbili University of Health and Allied Sciences. This ranking is based on the total number of documents published in scholarly journals indexed in the Scopus database by Elsevier. Based solely on the university's "excellence rate", the university was ranked 16th out of 62 universities in Africa in 2011. This rate "indicates which percentage of an institution's scientific output is included into the set formed by the 10% of the most cited papers in their respective scientific fields. It is a measure of high quality output of research institutions".

In July 2012, Webometrics ranked the university as the 1,977th best university worldwide based on its web presence (an assessment of the scholarly contents, visibility, and impact of the university on the web) but the best in Tanzania, with the Hubert Kairuki Memorial University far behind in second place.

Per United Kingdom-based Quacquarelli Symonds, UDSM is ranked first nationally and ranked third in East Africa in its newly released 2026 QS Sub-Saharan Africa Rankings.

== Campuses ==
The university has five campuses in and around the city of Dar es Salaam and operates academically through ten faculties, some of which are exclusive to specific campuses. For example, the College of Engineering and Technology campus houses the faculties of mechanical and chemical engineering, electrical and computer systems engineering, and civil engineering and the built environment. The faculty of humanities and social sciences is active in the Mkwawa University College of Education campus and also in the Dar es Salaam University College of Education.

The university, as of 2015, started offering a Doctor of Medicine program, which did not exist since its medical college, the Muhimbili College of Health Sciences (MUCHS), became a full-fledged university in 2007. The newly established college started as the University of Dar es Salaam School of Health Sciences (SOHS) at the Mlimani campus, then in 2017 relocated to Mbeya region as Mbeya College of Health and Allied Sciences (MCHAS) within the grounds of Mbeya zonal referral hospital.

The main campus, called Mlimani (meaning "on the hill" in Swahili), is located 13 kilometres west of Dar es Salaam city centre and is home to the basic faculties of education, arts and social science, and science. In addition, four specialist faculties – informatics and virtual education, law, commerce and management, and aquatic science and technology – have been established there. The Institute of Journalism and Mass Communication provides the university with its fifth campus.

The Nkrumah Hall, a building on the Mlimani campus, is featured on the back of the Tanzanian 500 shilling bill.

== Notable alumni ==
- Yoweri Kaguta Museveni, President of Uganda
- Mange Kimambi, opposition activist and social media influencer
- Aneth David, biotechnologist and molecular biologist
- Eunice Musiime, executive director of Akina Mama wa Afrika (AMwA)
- Francis K. Butagira, Ugandan diplomat
- Deborah Fahy Bryceson, University of Edinburgh
- John Garang, former Vice President of Sudan
- Seif Sharif Hamad, Secretary General of the Civic United Front
- Joseph Obgeb Jimmy, Namibian diplomat
- Jones Kyazze, author, academic, retired civil servant (UNESCO) former culture and tourism minister of Buganda government.
- Donald Kaberuka, President of the African Development Bank
- Laurent-Désiré Kabila, former President of DRC
- Zitto Kabwe, ACT Wazalendo leader
- Eriya Kategaya, former First Deputy Prime Minister of Uganda
- Jakaya Kikwete, former President of Tanzania
- Tundu Lissu, Tanzanian politician and former president Tanzania Law Society
- Edward Lowassa, former Prime Minister of Tanzania
- John Magufuli, former President of Tanzania
- Majaliwa Kassim Majaliwa, prime minister of Tanzania, November 2015 – present
- Tolly Mbwette, Tanzanian Engineer, educationist and former Vice Chancellor of OUT
- Patricia McFadden, Swazi author, and African radical feminist
- Halima Mdee, Member of parliament for CHADEMA
- Zakia Meghji, former Minister of Finance Tanzania
- Bernard Membe, Tanzanian Foreign Minister
- Asha-Rose Migiro, former Deputy Secretary-General of the UN
- Jokate Mwegelo, actress, District Commissioner of Kisarawe
- Joyce Ndalichako Minister of Education, Vocational training and Technology, Former Executive Secretary of NECTA
- Gertrude Mongella, former President of the Pan-African Parliament
- Yoweri Museveni, President of Uganda
- Willy Mutunga, Chief Justice of Kenya
- Juma Ngasongwa, former Tanzanian Trade Minister
- Mizengo Pinda, former Prime Minister of Tanzania
- Catherine Ruge, Member of parliament for CHADEMA
- Hulda Swai, Tanzanian researcher and professor in life sciences and bioengineering
- Irene Tarimo, researcher, academician and lecturer at OUT
- Joseph Warioba, former vice president and Prime Minister of Tanzania
- Penina Mlama, Tanzanian playwright and academic professor
- John Mnyika, Tanzanian and former Member of Parliament
- Kitila Mkumbo, Tanzanian academic professor and politician
- Shukrani Manya, Tanzanian academic professor and former cabinet minister
- Flower Msuya, Tanzanian Phycologist and researcher
- Teofilus Shaende, Air Vice Marshal Commander of Namibian Air Force
- Imani Sanga, Music Professor at the University of Dar es Salaam

== Notable faculty ==
- Adelaida K. Semesi, Professor of Marine Science
- Giovanni Arrighi, lecturer in economics from 1967 to 1969
- Henry Bernstein, emeritus professor, SOAS
- Molly Mahood, professor of English from 1954 to 1963
- Milton Santos, professor of geography from 1974 to 1976
- Walter Rodney, Guyanese scholar and politician
- Yash Tandon, former head of the South Centre (previously, the South Commission)

== Gallery ==
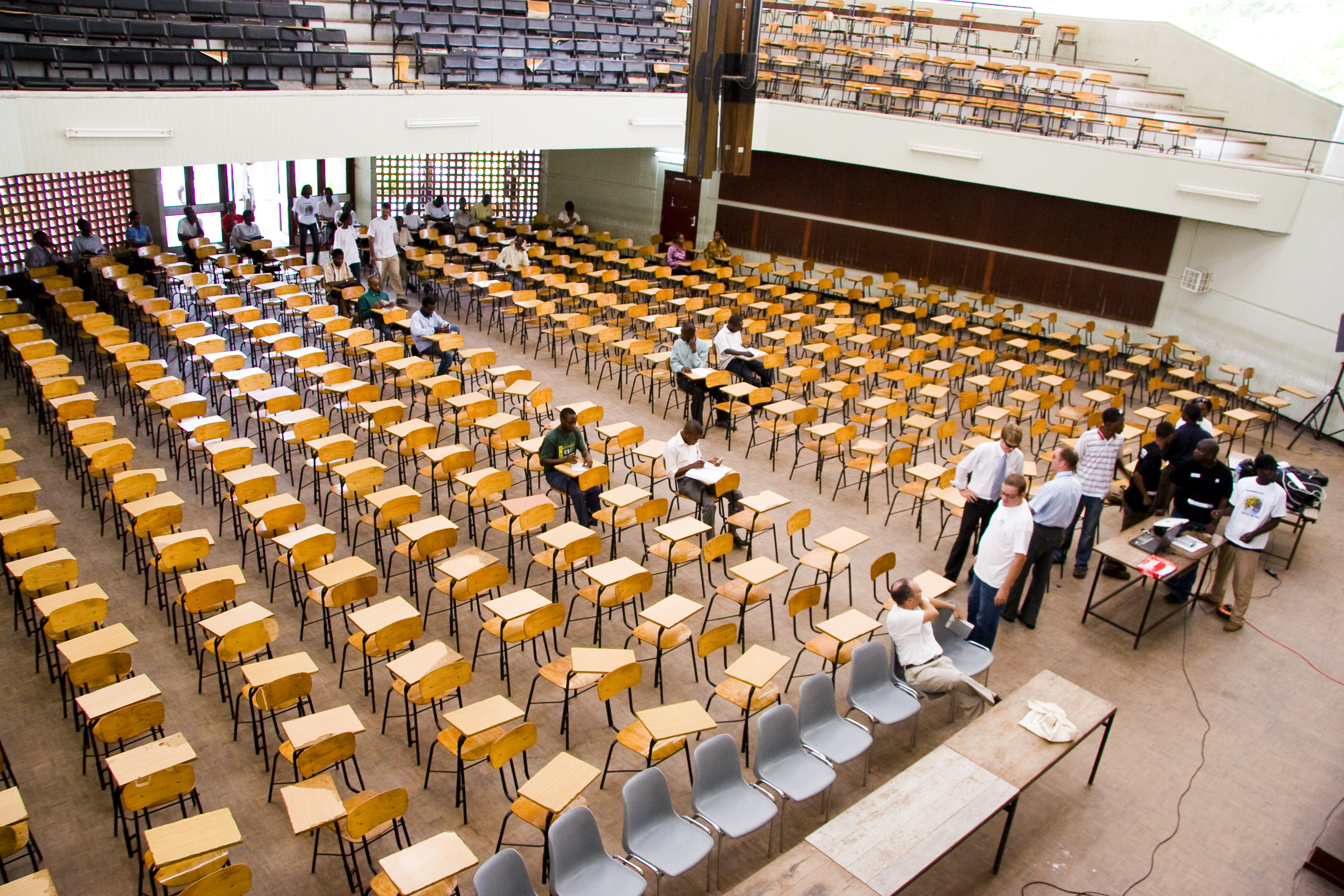
The interior of the Nkrumah Hall at the university of Dar es Salaam.

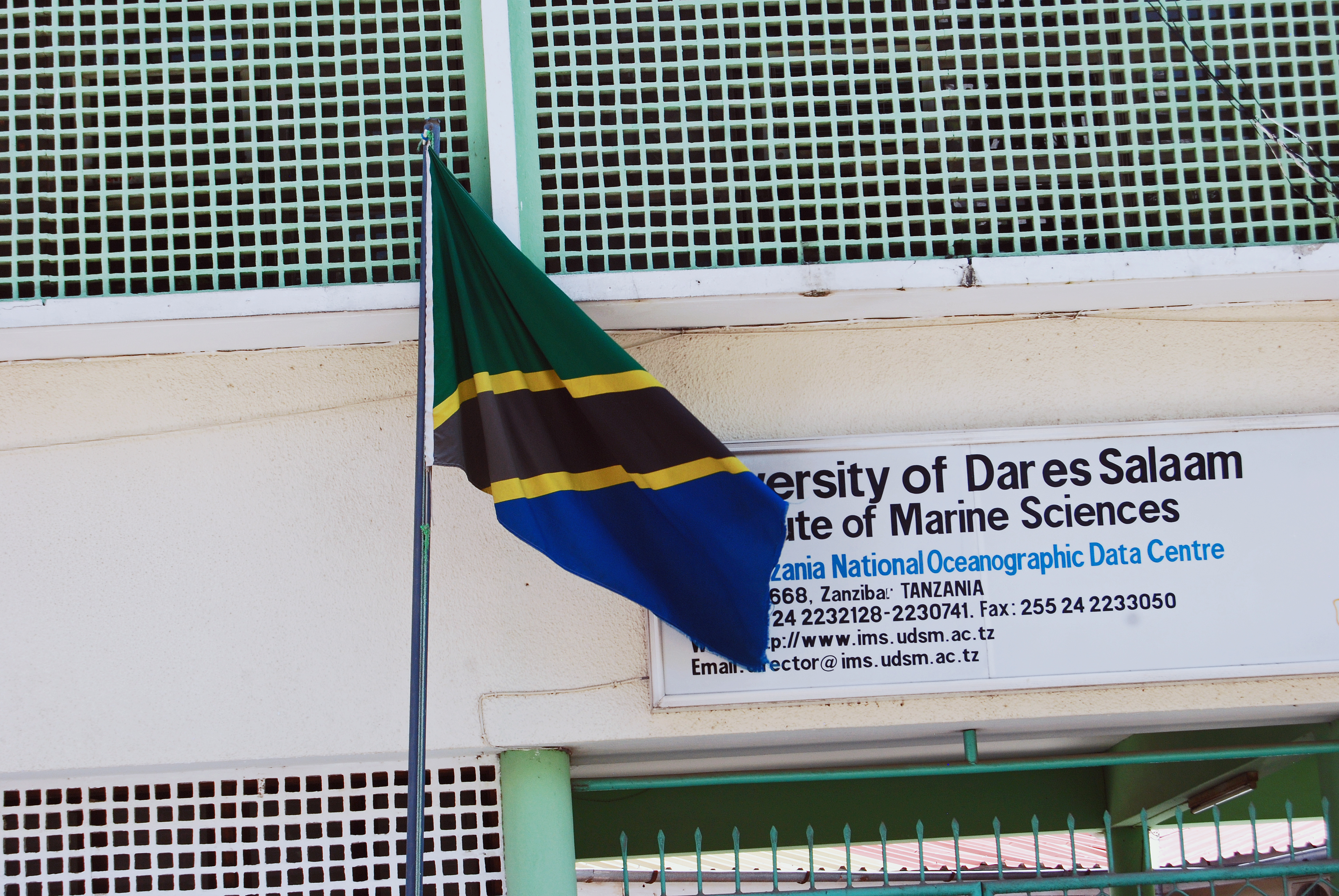
The Institute of Marine Sciences based in the island of Zanzibar.
