= Kisima, Kilimanjaro =

Ward in Same District, Kilimanjaro Region

Kisima Ward Kata ya Kisima (Swahili)
- Ward
- Kata ya Kisima, Wilaya ya Same
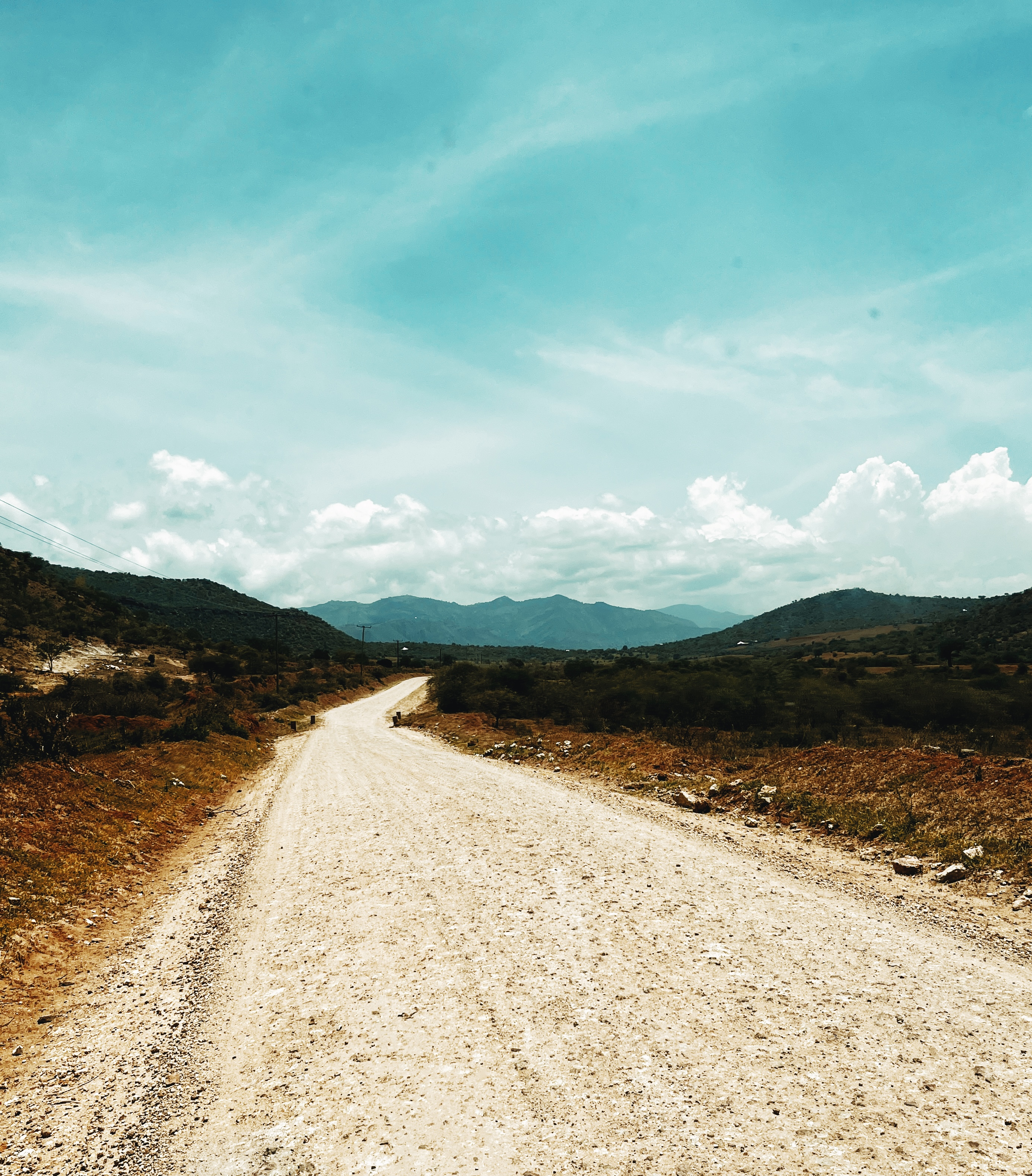
- Landscape scene in Kisima Ward, Same District
- Nickname: The Well
- Location within Tanzania
- Country: Tanzania
- Region: Kilimanjaro Region
- District: Same District

Area
  - Total: 20.2 km^{2} (7.8 sq mi)
- Elevation: 984 m (3,228 ft)

Population (2012)
  - Total: 9,885
  - Density: 489/km^{2} (1,270/sq mi)

Kisima is an administrative ward in Same District of Kilimanjaro Region in Tanzania. The ward covers an area of 20.2 km^{2} (7.8 sq mi), and has an average elevation of 984 m (3,228 ft). According to the 2012 census, the ward has a total population of 9,885.
