= Mhezi =

Ward in Same District, Kilimanjaro Region, Tanzania

Mhezi Ward Kata ya Mhezi (Swahili)
- Ward
- Kata ya Mhezi, Wilaya ya Same
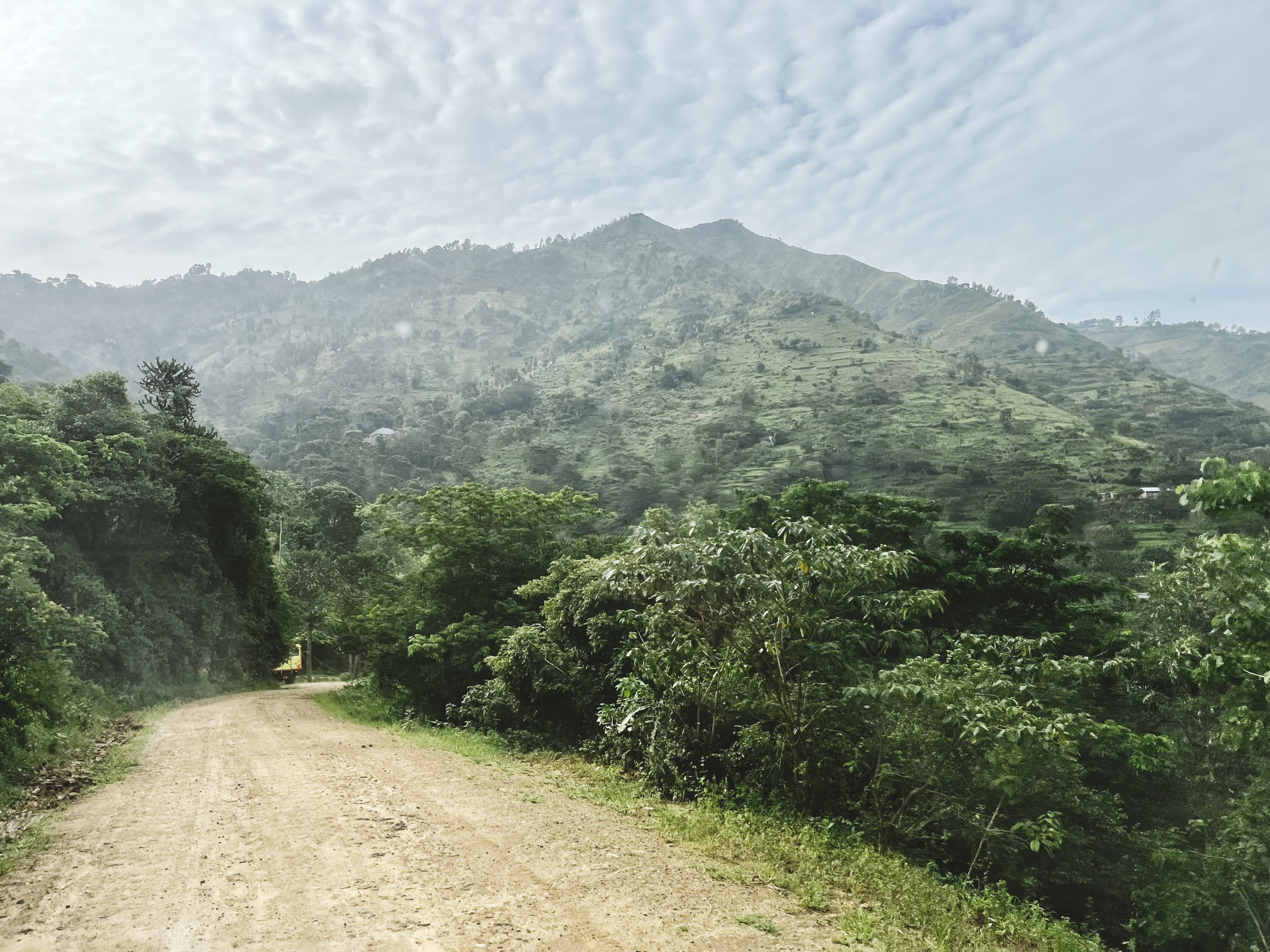
- Scene in Mhezi Ward, Same District

- Location within Tanzania
- Country: Tanzania
- Region: Kilimanjaro Region
- District: Same District

Area
  - Total: 22.7 km^{2} (8.8 sq mi)
- Elevation: 1,687 m (5,535 ft)

Population (2012)
  - Total: 4,790
  - Density: 211/km^{2} (547/sq mi)

Mhezi is an administrative ward in Same District of Kilimanjaro Region in Tanzania. The ward covers an area of 22.7 km^{2} (8.8 sq mi), and has an average elevation of 1,687 m (5,535 ft). According to the 2012 census, the ward has a total population of 4,790.
