= Vudee =

Ward in Same District, Kilimanjaro Region, Tanzania

Vudee Ward Kata ya Vudee (Swahili)
- Ward
- Kata ya Vudee, Wilaya ya Same
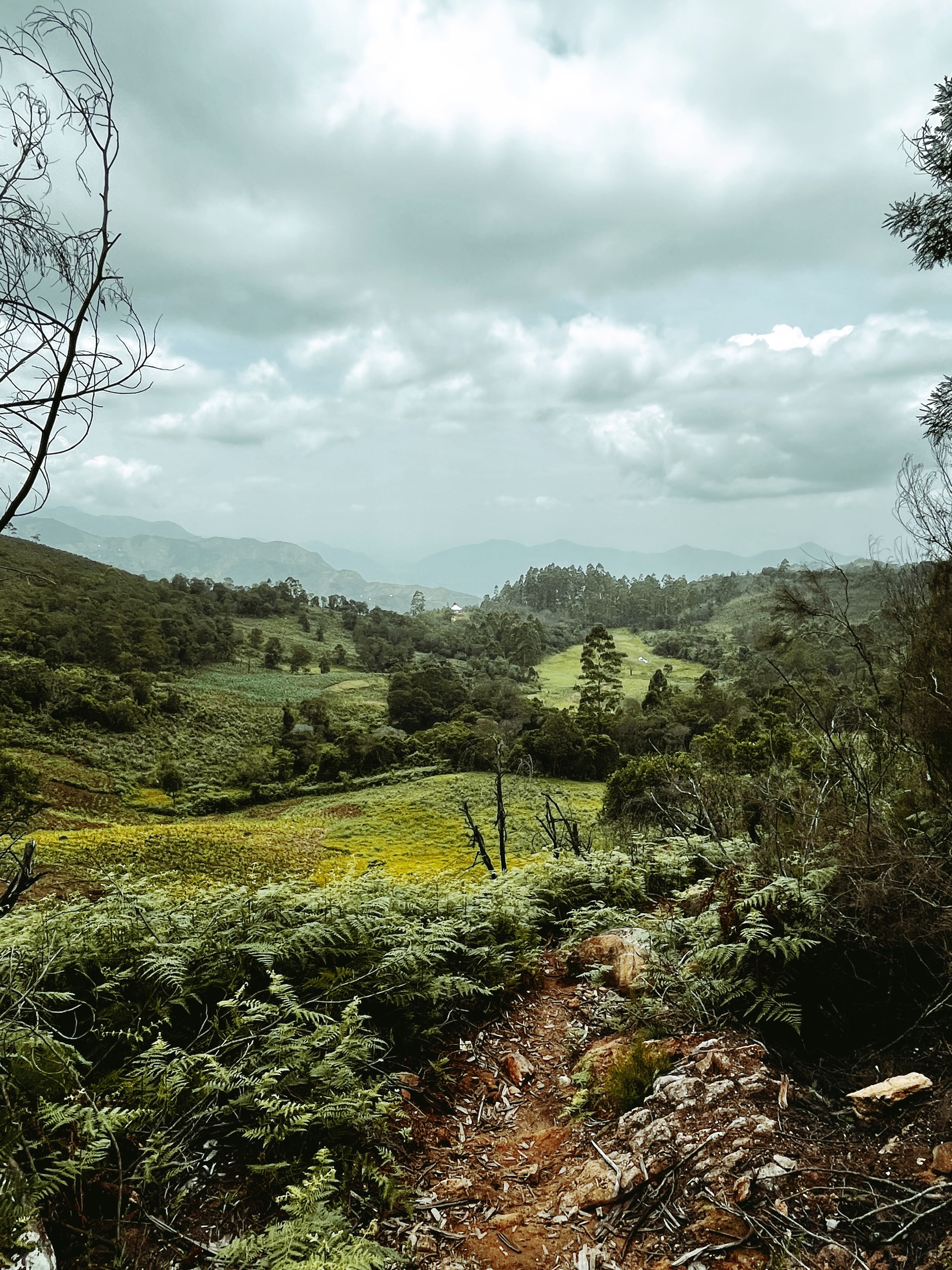
- Landscape in Vudee Ward, Same District

- Location within Tanzania
- Country: Tanzania
- Region: Kilimanjaro Region
- District: Same District

Area
  - Total: 42.06 km^{2} (16.24 sq mi)
- Elevation: 1,349 m (4,426 ft)

Population (2012)
  - Total: 7,120
  - Density: 169/km^{2} (438/sq mi)

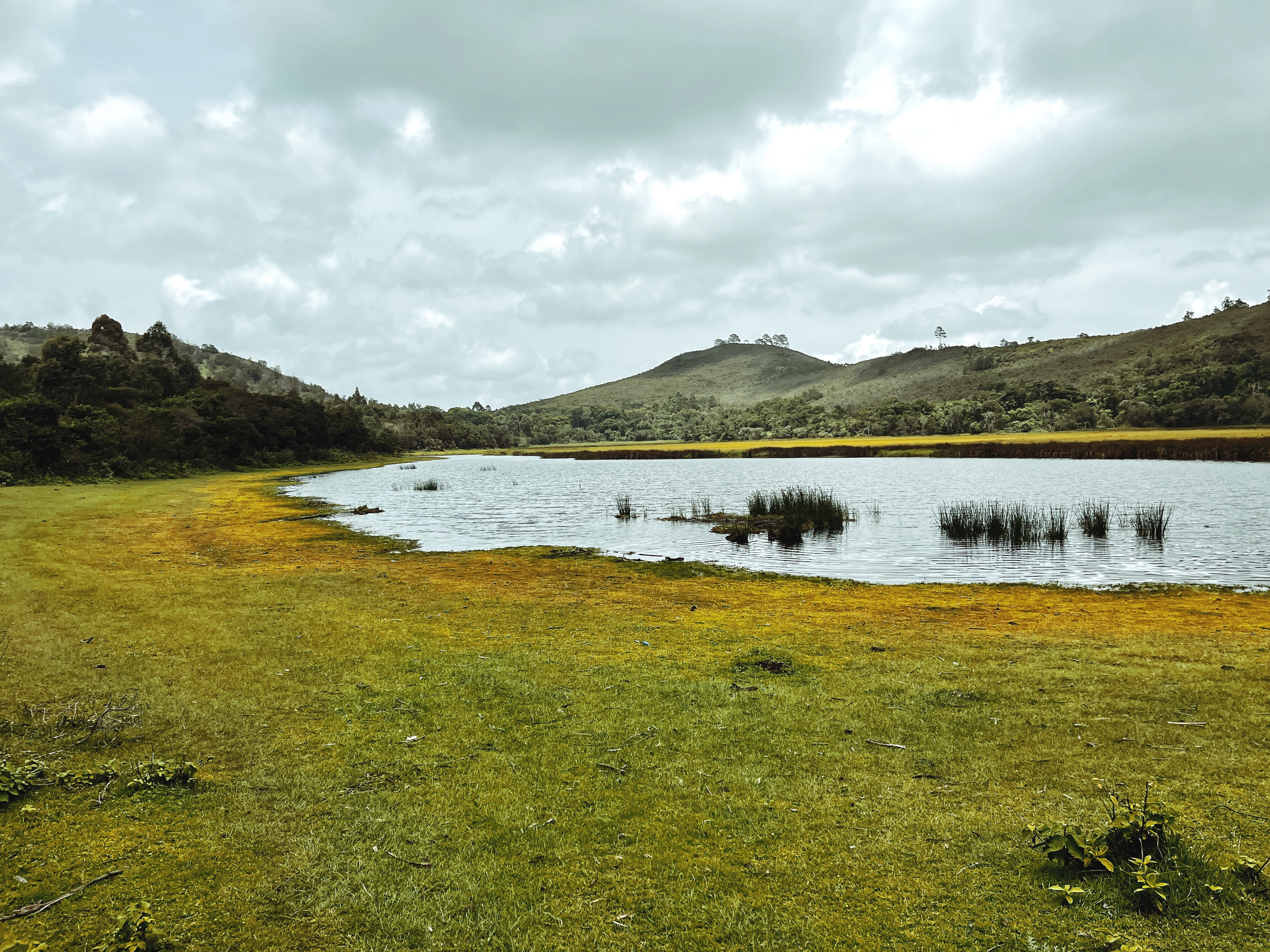
Lake Ranzi, Vudee Ward, Same District

Vudee is an administrative ward in Same District of Kilimanjaro Region in Tanzania. The ward covers an area of 42.06 km^{2} (16.24 sq mi), and has an average elevation of 1,349 m (4,426 ft). According to the 2012 census, the ward has a total population of 7,120.
