= Same District, Kilimanjaro =

District of Kilimanjaro Region, Tanzania

Same District Wilaya ya Same (Swahili)
- District
- Wilaya ya Same, Mkoa wa Kilimanjaro
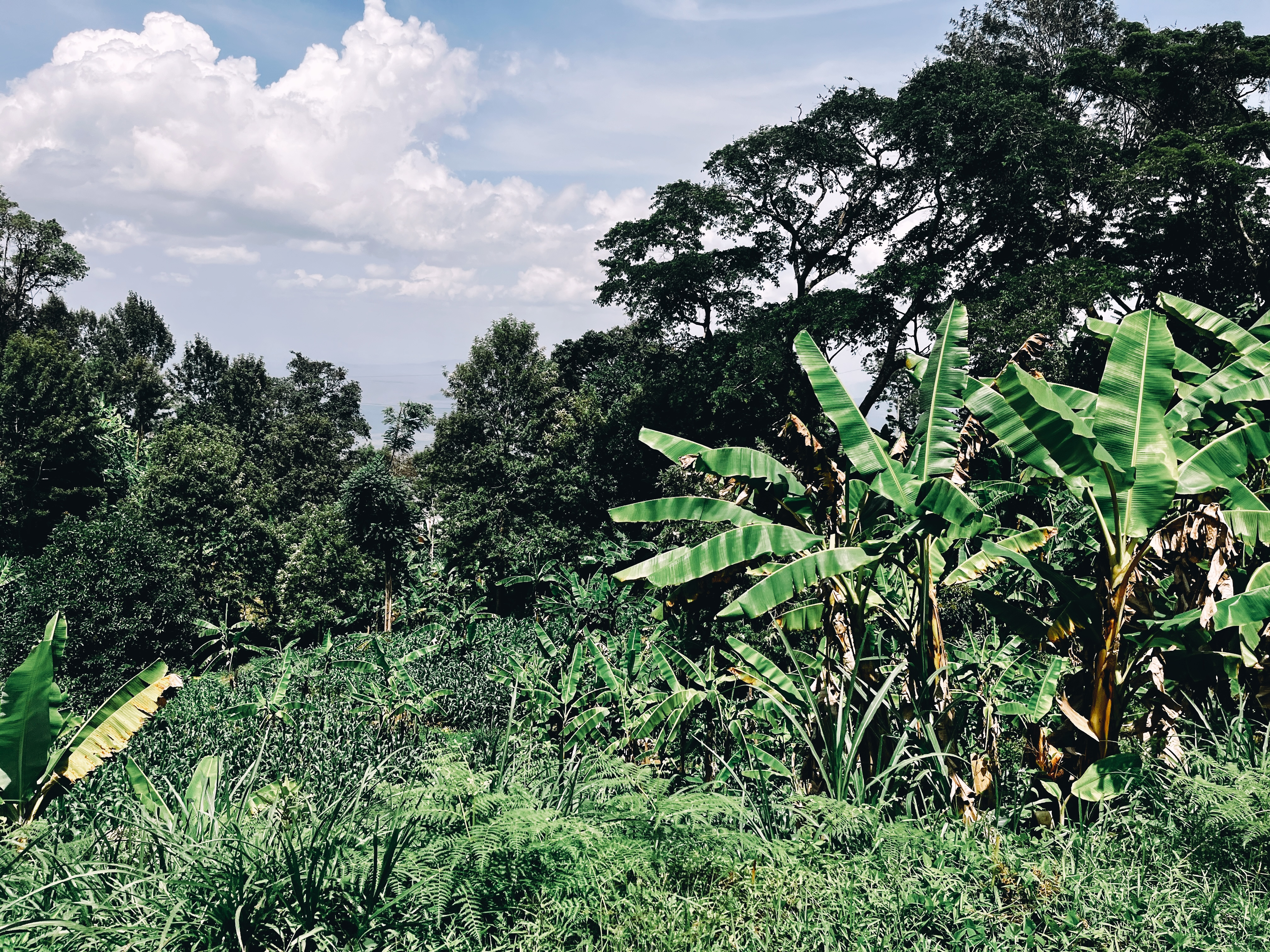
- Banana grove in Mshewa Ward, Same District
- Nickname: "Home of the South Pare Mountains"
- Same District in Kilimanjaro Region 2022
- Coordinates: 03°22′21″S 36°41′40″E
- Country: Tanzania
- Region: Kilimanjaro Region
- Capital: Same

Area
  - Total: 6,221 km^{2} (2,402 sq mi)
- Elevation: 537 m (1,762 ft)
- Highest elevation: 2,463 m (8,081 ft)

Population (2022)
  - Total: 300,303
  - Density: 48.27/km^{2} (125.0/sq mi)
- Demonym: Samean

Ethnic groups
  - Settler: Swahili
  - Native: Pare
- Tanzanian Postal Code: 25-6
- Website: District website

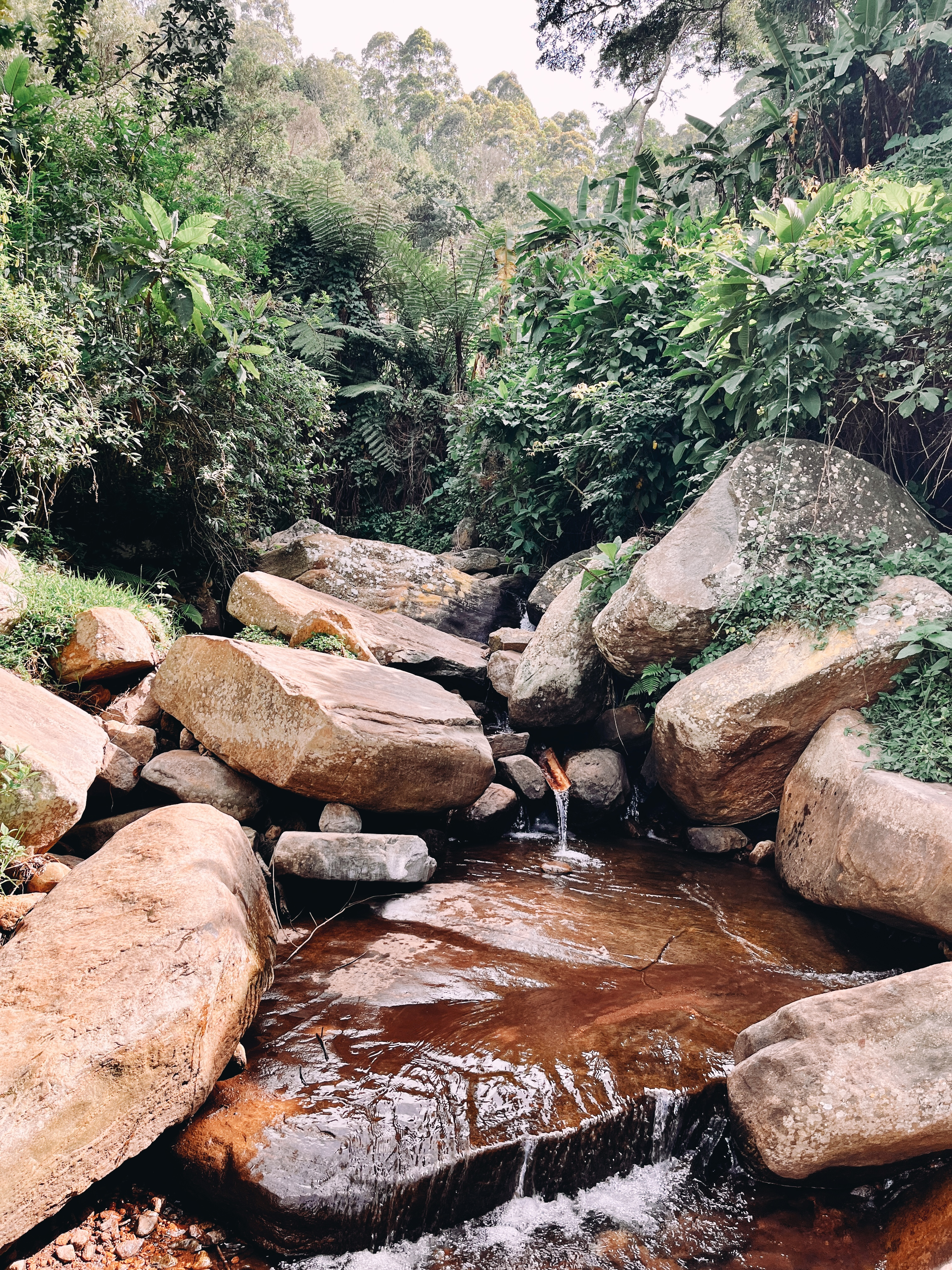
Nakombo River, Mshewa Ward, Same

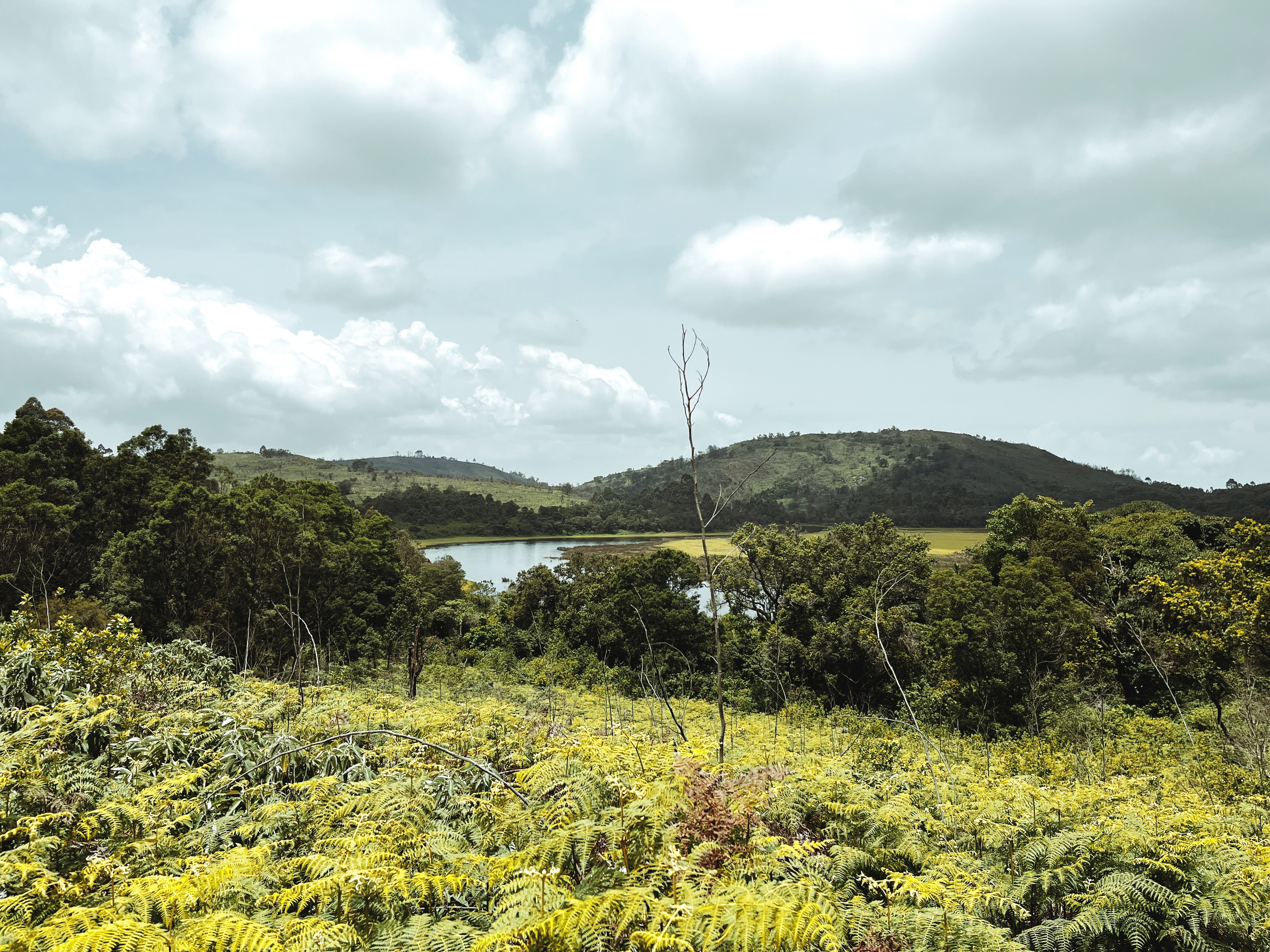
Lake Ranzi landscape, Vudee Ward, Same

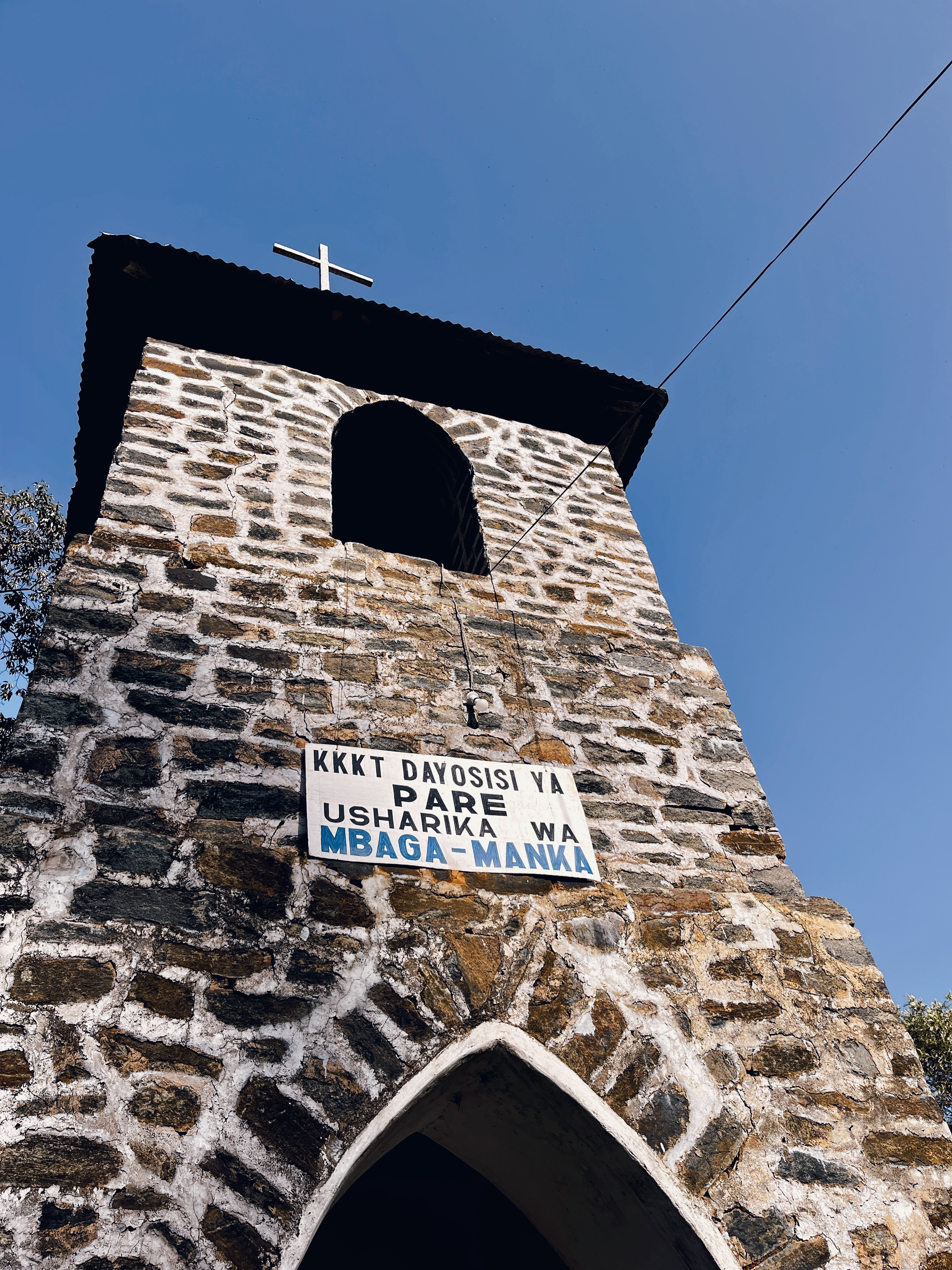
Lutheran Church detail, Mshewa Ward, Same

Same is one of the seven districts of the Kilimanjaro Region of Tanzania. It is bordered to the north by the Mwanga District, to the northeast by Kenya, to the south and southeast by the Korogwe District and Lushoto District of Tanga Region, and to the west by Simanjiro District of Manyara Region. The district capital is the town of Same, Tanzania. The south Pare Mountains are located within the district's boundaries and so is a part of Mkomazi National Park. According to the 2002 Tanzania National Census, the population of the Same District was 212,235. The population had risen to 300,303 according to the 2022 Tanzania National Census.

== Geography ==
The district covers an area of 6,221 km^{2} (2,402 sq mi), and has an average elevation of 1,034 m (3,392 ft). The tallest point being Shengena Peak at 2, 463m. The district is home to Mkomazi National Park, and a few other protected areas such as Chome Forest Reserve which is home to the South Pare white-eye, an endemic bird found only the district.

== Economy ==
Paved Trunk road T2 from Dar es Salaam to Arusha passes through the Same District, thus making the road an important economic boost for the district bringing goods and services to the district. The district's main income source is agriculture, for both commercial and subsistence needs. Commercial agricultural products in Same are Sisal. However tourisms is slowly becoming a source of foreign exchange with the popularity of Mkomazi national Park and the Chome Forest Reserve. The Usambara Railway from Tanga to Arusha passes through the district as well.

== Administrative subdivisions ==
=== Wards ===
As of 2012, the Same District is administratively divided into 31 wards:

- Bangalala
- Bombo
- Bendera
- Bwambo
- Chome
- Hedaru
- Mabilion
- Kihurio
- Kirangare
- Kisiwani
- Makanya

- Maore
- Mhezi
- Mpinji
- Mshewa
- Msindo
- Mtii
- Mwembe
- Myamba
- Ndungu
- Kalemawe

- Njoro
- Vumari
- Ruvu
- Same
- Kisima
- Steshen
- Suji
- Vudee
- Vuje
- Vunta
- Lugulu
