= Akina Mama wa Afrika =

Pan-African non-governmental organization

- Founded: 1985; 41 years ago, United Kingdom
- Type: non-governmental organization
- Location: Kampala, Uganda
- Fields: Legal advocacy, education
- Executive Director: Eunice Musiime
- Affiliations: Progressive International
- Website: www.akinamamawaafrika.org

Akina Mama wa Afrika (AMwA) (Swahili for "African women") was established in 1985 in the United Kingdom as a small community organisation for African women. It is now an international and Pan-African feminist non-governmental organisation headquartered in Kampala, Uganda.

== Service ==
AMwA is described as a "training centre" and "advocacy engine" for the women's movement in Africa. It focuses on enhancing women's ability to participate in leadership through education programs, resource and research, providing platforms for advocacy and movements to influence politics and legislation.

In 2014, AMwA, with other women's organisations, conducted a regional conference in Kampala on the theme "Strengthening African Women’s Voices in the Post-2015 Processes". The conference intended to serve as a reminder of the common issues African women continue to face, including gender-based violence.

Some of the organisations that have helped support Akina Mama wa Afrika include the African Women's Development Fund and the Sigrid Rausing Trust.

=== The African Women’s Leadership Institute (AWLI) ===
The AWLI, established first in 1996, focus on themes such as gender-based violence, Sexual and Reproductive Health and Rights, anti-poverty efforts and peace building. It is designed by women leaders from Africa, for providing professional support, networking opportunities and workshops to women activists aged 18–45 from across the continent.

== See also ==
- Christine Butegwa
- Bisi Adeleye-Fayemi
- Zeedah Meierhofer-Mangeli
