= Catherine Ruge =

Tanzanian politician

Catherine Ruge (born June 25, 1982) is a Tanzanian politician who served as the Chadema (Special Seats) MP for Serengeti, between 2017 and 2020.

== Early years and education ==
Ruge graduated high school in Dodoma in 2003. She attended the University of Dar es Salaam (UDSM) from 2004 to 2007, obtaining a degree in Business and Accounting. In 2015 she gained her master's degree in Business Management at the Eastern and Southern African Management Institute. Currently, she is pursuing a doctoral degree (PhD) at UDSM on gender issues in the field of accounting. Ruge is a Certified Public Accountant (CPA), holding the CPA certificate accredited by the National Board of Accountants and Auditors (NBAA) in Tanzania.

== Politics ==
Ruge entered politics while attending UDSM. In 2005, she became a youth activist in the Ubungo constituency, helping John Mnyika to win the election as member of parliament. She joined Chadema in 2010, and successfully ran for the position of Finance Secretary in the Serengeti region. On May 4, 2017, she was appointed by the Chadema NEC to be the chairman of the party's Special Seats, replacing Dr Elly Marco Macha.
