= Uganda Association of Women Lawyers (FIDA-U) =

Non-governmental organization

The Uganda Association of Women Lawyers (FIDA-U), established in 1974, is a pioneer of legal aid and public education in sub Saharan Africa. It is a membership based organization which has been an NGO since 1999.

FIDA promotes professional development of women in the justice law and order sector. It is part of the Human rights, Legal Aid provider and NGO networks at the grass root, national and international levels. It also does public interest litigation in Uganda.

== Focus areas ==
FIDA focuses on advancing gender responsibility governance and women's effective participation in public life. It also roots for the promotion of socio-economic rights and enhancing access to justice for women.

Furthermore, FIDA enables and empowers poor and vulnerable women and children to defend their rights through provision of legal Aid services.

It addresses the causes of vulnerability and powerlessness among women and identifies sustainable and cost effective legal AID interventions.

== Geographical reach ==
FIDA has offices in Arua, Gulu, Kabale, Kamuli, Kapchworwa, Kitgum, Lwengo and Lamwo districts.
