= List of Patna University people =

List of notable alumni and faculty of Patna University

This is a list of notable alumni and faculty of Patna University.

== Notable faculty ==
The following people have taught or held academic posts at Patna University.

Name	Field / Affiliation	Notability	References
H. C. Verma	Physics	Indian experimental physicist; author of popular physics textbooks	
Nalin Vilochan Sharma	Hindi literature	Writer and poet	
Ram Sharan Sharma	History	Prominent historian and academic	
Rameshwar Singh Kashyap	Bhojpuri literature	Playwright and author	
Kapil Muni Tiwary	Linguistics	Linguist and academic	
Hetukar Jha	Sociology	Sociologist; former head of Sociology	
Papiya Ghosh	History	Historian	
R. K. Sinha	English	Scholar of English literature	
Ravindra Kumar Sinha	Environmental science / Zoology	Environmentalist; Padma Shri recipient	

== Notable alumni ==
=== Politics and law ===
Name	Class year / Degree	Notability	References
Abhayanand		Educationalist; former IPS officer; co-founder of Super 30	
Anugrah Narayan Sinha		Nationalist leader; first Deputy Chief Minister of Bihar	
Baccha Prasad Singh		Indian Maoist politician	
Bali Ram Bhagat		Former Speaker of the Lok Sabha	
Balmiki Prasad Singh		Scholar; Governor of Sikkim (2008–2013)	
Bhuvaneshwar Prasad Sinha		6th Chief Justice of India	
Chhedi Paswan		Member of Parliament	
Dilip Sinha		Indian diplomat and ambassador	
Digvijay Singh		Former Union Minister of India	
Jagdeo Prasad		Former Deputy Chief Minister of Bihar	
J. P. Nadda		Politician; Former national president (BJP)	
Krishna Sahi		Former Union Minister	
Shri Krishna Singh		First Chief Minister of Bihar	
Lalit Mohan Sharma		Former Chief Justice of India	
Lalu Prasad Yadav		Former Chief Minister of Bihar	
Nitish Kumar		Chief Minister of Bihar	
Ram Deo Bhandary		Former Member of Parliament; former RJD General Secretary	
Ram Dulari Sinha		Former Union Minister of State; former Governor of Kerala	
Ram Vilas Paswan		Founder of Lok Janshakti Party; former Union Minister	
Rajiv Gauba	BSc (Physics)	32nd Cabinet Secretary of India	
Ravi Shankar Prasad		Senior advocate; Union Minister (IT; Law & Justice)	
Sanjay Paswan		Professor; former Minister of State; Bihar Legislative Council member	
Satyendra Narayan Sinha		Former Chief Minister of Bihar	
Sitaram Kesari		Former President of the Indian National Congress	
Srinivas Kumar Sinha	1943	Former Governor of Assam; Army officer	
Surur Hoda		Socialist leader	
Tejendra Khanna	MSc (Physics)	Former Lieutenant Governor of Delhi	
Vijay Kumar Chaudhary		Bihar Minister of Water Resources	
Yashwant Sinha		Former Union Finance Minister	

=== Science and technology ===
Name	Class year / Degree	Notability	References
Anand Kumar		Mathematician; founder of Super 30	
Devendra Prasad Gupta		Botanist and academic	
H. C. Verma		Indian experimental physicist (also faculty)	
Ravindra Kumar Sinha		Environmentalist (also faculty)	
Samprada Singh		Founder of Alkem Laboratories	
Sudhanshu Shekhar Jha		Condensed-matter physicist	
Tathagat Avatar Tulsi		Physicist; child prodigy	
Vashishtha Narayan Singh		Mathematician	

=== Arts and entertainment ===
Name	Class year / Degree	Notability	References
Chandan Roy		Actor (known for Panchayat)	
Sharda Sinha		Folk singer	
SXMRXXT		Indian Rapper and Record Producer	
Rashmi Sharma		Indian Tv and Films Producer	

=== Literature ===
Name	Class year / Degree	Notability	References
Kalim Ajiz		Urdu poet	
Ramdhari Singh Dinkar		Hindi poet	
Satinath Bhaduri		Novelist	
Samraat Singh		Indian author and Novelist	

=== Others ===
Name	Class year / Degree	Notability	References
Abdul Bari		Academic and social worker	
Bindeshwar Pathak		Founder of Sulabh International	
Gopal Prasad Sinha		Neurologist and politician	
Indradeep Sinha		Economist, writer and communist leader	
Jayaprakash Narayan		Freedom fighter and political leader	
Md Zabir Ansari		Karate player	
Ram Karan Sharma		Scholar of Sanskrit	
Ram Raj Pant		Founder of Nepal Law College; linguist of Nepali	
Ranjit Sinha		Former Director, Central Bureau of Investigation	
Ravish Kumar		News anchor and journalist (NDTV)	
Rustum Roy		Materials scientist and author	
Shaibal Gupta		Economist and social scientist	
Vikas Jha		Author and journalist	

== See also ==
- Patna University
