= Jha (surname) =

Jha (Maithili, Hindi and Nepali: झा Jhā) is a surname of Maithil Brahmins native to the Mithila region of India and Nepal.

The surname Jha means "teacher" or "scholar," coming from a shortened form of the Sanskrit word Upadhyaya. The ancient Sanskrit title Upadhyaya evolved into the Prakrit form Uvajjhaya, which later contracted phonetically over time into Ojha and eventually Jha. Historically associated with Vedic scholarship, teaching, and astrology, families bearing the Jha surname have traditionally been linked to learning and religious traditions.

Notable people with the name include:

== A–B ==
- Acharya Rameshwar Jha, Sanskrit scholar
- Aditya Narayan Jha, Indian singer, host, actor
- Aditya Nath Jha (1911–1972), Indian Civil Service, recipient of the Padma Vibhushan
- Ajay Jha (1956–2013), Indian cricketer
- Amardeep Jha (born 1960), Indian film and television actress
- Amarnath Jha (c. 1888–1947) Indian academic, university Vice Chancellor
- Amishi Jha, American neuroscientist and professor of psychology
- Anshuman Jha (born 1986), Indian actor
- Anuranjan Jha (born 1977), Indian journalist
- Anurita Jha (born 1986), Indian actress
- Apoorvanand Jha, Indian professor of Hindi
- Ashish Jha, Dean of Brown University School of Public Health
- Bedanand Jha (died 2006), Nepalese politician
- Bhogendra Jha (died 2009), Indian politician
- Bidhu Jha (born 1942), Canadian politician
- Binodanand Jha (born 1900), Indian politician, Chief Minister of Bihar

== C–N ==
- Chandeshwor Jha, Nepalese politician
- D. N. Jha (born 1940-2021), Indian historian and professor
- Durgananda Jha (1941–1963), Nepalese failed assassin
- Ganganath Jha (1842–1971), Sanskrit and philosophy scholar from Bihar
- Gonu Jha (13th century), Indian wit character
- Hetukar Jha (born 1944), Indian author and professor of sociology
- Kamal Nath Jha (1923–2003), Indian freedom fighter, social activist, and politician
- Kanak Jha two-time Olympian (2016 and 2020) and was the 4 times US national champion Table Tennis player
- Kanchinath Jha "Kiran" (1906–1989), Indian Maithili-language writer
- Kaveri Jha (born 1983), Indian film actress
- Kirti Azad (born 1959), Indian politician and former cricketer
- Komal Jha (born 1987), Indian film actress
- Kranti Prakash Jha, Indian film actor
- Lakshmi Kant Jha (1913–1988), Governor of the Reserve Bank of India
- Lal Jha alias Lavkavi - Maithil poet
- Manish Jha (director) (born 1978), Indian film director and screenwriter
- Manoj Kumar Jha, an Indian politician
- Nagendra Nath Jha (born 1935), Indian diplomat and lieutenant governor
- Narendra Jha (1964–2018), Indian television actor
- Nidhi Jha, Indian television actress

== P–R ==
- Pankaj Jha, Indian actor
- Parmanand Jha (born 1946), Nepalese politician, Vice President of Nepal
- Piyush Jha, Indian director and screenwriter
- Prabhat Jha (epidemiologist) (born 1965), Indian-Canadian epidemiologist and health economist
- Prabhat Jha (politician) (born 1957), Indian MP and National Vice President of Bharatiya Janata Party
- Prakash Jha (born 1952), Indian film producer, director and screenwriter
- Prayag Jha (born 1945), Indian artist specializing in etching
- Prem Shankar Jha (born 1938), Indian journalist, author and columnist
- Radhanandan Jha (1929–2005), Indian politician from the Congress Party
- Radhika Jha (born 1970), Indian novelist
- Raghunath Jha (born 1939), Indian politician
- Raj Kamal Jha (born 1966), Indian novelist and journalist
- Rajeev Jha (born 1976), Nepalese politician and General Secretary of Nepal Sadbhavana Party
- Ramashreya Jha (1928–2009), Indian composer and teacher of Hindustani classical music
- Ramesh Chandra Jha (1928–1994), Indian poet, novelist and freedom fighter

== S–V ==
- Sanjay Jha (born 1963), Indian businessman and CEO
- Sanjeev Jha (born 1979), Indian politician
- Saurav Jha, Indian commentator on energy and security
- Shriya Jha (born 1986), Indian film and television actress
- Shubhashish Jha (born 8 March 1991), Indian television actor
- Sriram Jha (born 1976), Indian chess grandmaster
- Sriti Jha (born 1986), Indian television actress
- Sudhanshu Shekhar Jha (born 1940), Indian condensed matter physicist
- Surendra Jha 'Suman' (1910–2002), Indian Maithili-language poet
- Suvarna Jha, Indian television actress
- Tarakant Jha (1927–2014), Indian chairperson of the Bihar Legislative Council
- Udit Narayan Jha (born 1955), Bollywood playback singer
- Vartika Jha (born 2000), Indian dancer, choreographer and actress
- Vikas Kumar Jha, Indian journalist and author
- Vinay Kumar Jha (born 1971), Nepalese cricket umpire
