= Irene Tarimo =

Tanzanian scientist, biologist and educator

Lecturer Irene Tarimo
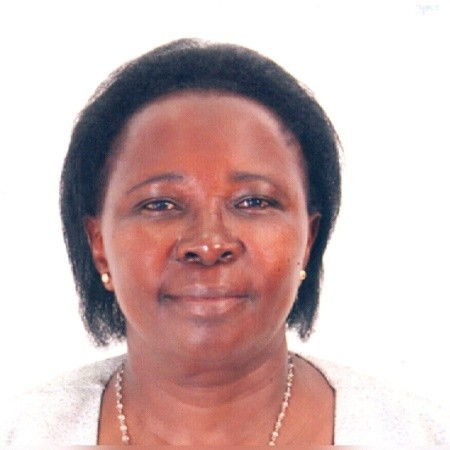
- Born: 1 October 1964 (age 61); Kilimanjaro Region, Tanzania, U.R.T.
- Other name: Irene Aurelia Tarimo
- Education: Dar es Salaam University College of Education (DipEd); University of Dar es Salaam (MSc); Open University of Tanzania-Copenhagen University (PhD); Open University of Tanzania (BEd)
- Title: Co-founder, Tanzania Environmental Conservation Society
- Relatives: John Mrosso, Henry Rimisho
- Scientific career
- Fields: Research; teaching; consultancy; law
- Workplaces: Open University of Tanzania
- Doctoral advisors: Tolly Mbwette, Sven Erik Jorgensen, Senzia Masoud, Crispin Kinabo, Sixtus Kayombo
- Military career
- Allegiance: United Rep. of Tanzania
- Branch: National Service

Irene Aurelia Tarimo (born 1 October 1964) is a Tanzanian environmental scientist and educator. She currently serves as head of the department of environmental studies at the Open University of Tanzania (OUT), where she is also a lecturer and a researcher. She previously served as OUT director in the Lindi Region from 2007 to 2015.

== Academic degrees and honours ==
In 1983, Tarimo obtained a diploma in biology, chemistry and education from the Dar es Salaam Teachers College, now Dar es Salaam University College of Education. In 2003, she was awarded a bachelor's degree of Science in education (honors) form the Open University of Tanzania. In 2007 she earned a Master of Science in environmental science (thesis) from University of Dar es Salaam and a Doctor of Science in environmental pollution control and ecological modelling from Open University of Tanzania sandwich with Copenhagen University. In 2011, she was a visiting scholar at the University of Montana. In 2019, she received a certificate from Centre for Foreign Relations.

== Selected works ==
- Tarimo, Irene; Yohana, Lawi; Senzia, M. A.; Mbogo, M.; Mbwette, Tolly S. A. (December 2014). "Modelling of Municipal Wastewater Treatment in a System Consisting of Waste Stabilization Ponds, Constructed Wetlands and Fish Ponds in Tanzania". In Sven Erik Jørgensen; Ni-Bing Chan; Fu-Liu Xu (eds.). Ecological Modelling and Engineering of Lakes and Wetlands. Elsevier. doi:10.1016/B978-0-444-63249-4.00025-7 – via ResearchGate.
- Tarimo, Irene (11 December 2013). Factors Affecting Students' Enrollment and Dropout at The Open University of Tanzania, Lindi Region. African Journals Online.
- Tarimo, Irene (24–27 March 2020). TEACHING AND LEARNING IN ODL BLENDED MODEL ENVIRONMENT. Association of African Universities. Archived from the original on 12 April 2023.
- Tarimo, Irene; Kihampa, Harieth (6 January 2016). Quality of Reclaimed Water and Reared Catfish Carp in Aquaculture Ponds Receiving Treated Municipal Wastewater: Implications to Human Health (PDF). Elixir. Archived from the original (PDF) on 3 July 2020.
- Tarimo, Irene (24 June 2021). Environmental Pollution Control Using Wetlands in Poverty Alleviation for Sustainable Development in Tanzania (PDF). Elixir. Archived from the original (PDF) on 30 May 2022.
