= Tauseef Alam =

Indian politician

Member of the Bihar Legislative Assembly
- In office 2005–2020
- Preceded by: Jahidur Rahman
- Succeeded by: Mohammad Anzar Nayeemi
- Constituency: Bahadurganj
- Incumbent
- Assumed office 2025
- Preceded by: Mohammad Anzar Nayeemi
- Constituency: Bahadurganj

Personal details
- Born: January 1, 1980 (age 46) Gargawn Millik, Kishanganj, Bihar
- Party: All India Majlis-e-Ittehadul Muslimeen
- Spouse: Tarana Ashfi (m.2013)

Tauseef Alam (born 1 January 1980) is an Indian politician. He was a member of Bihar Legislative Assembly from 2005 until 2020 representing Bahadurganj Vidhan Sabha constituency. He was the youngest MLA at the age of 26 after winning the February 2005 election.

== Early life and education ==
Md Tauseef Alam was born in village Gargawn Milik in Bahadurganj, Kishanganj, Bihar. He has done his Fauqania (10th) in 1996 from Bihar Madarsa Education Board. In 1998 he moved into politics and served as mukhya during 2000 to 2004.

== Personal life ==
His father's name is Jamshed Alam. Md Tauseef Alam married Tarana Ashfi in year 2013. He is son-in-law of Izhar Asfi.

== Political career ==
In 1998, he entered politics. In February 2005 Bihar Legislative Assembly election he contested as an independent candidate from Bahadurganj Vidhan Sabha and got elected at the age of 26. But due to hung assembly no government could be formed in Bihar. Fresh elections were held in October–November the same year. President's rule was imposed in between the two elections. And in October 2005 Bihar Legislative Assembly elections he contested as an Indian National Congress candidate and saved his seat again. In two consecutive elections, 2010 & 2015, he had his third and fourth win respectively. In the 2015 election he defeated Awadh Bihari Singh of BJP by 13,942 votes.
