= Vedastus Manyinyi =

Tanzanian politician

Honorable Vedastus Manyinyi MP

Member of Parliament
- Incumbent
- Assumed office 2015
- Preceded by: Vincent Nyerere
- Constituency: Musoma Town Constituency

Personal details
- Born: Vedastus Mathayo Manyinyi; 1 July 1967 (age 58) Musoma Region, Tanzania
- Political party: Party of the Revolution
- Education: Morembe Secondary School; Makoko Seminary
- Alma mater: Open University of Tanzania

Vedastus Mathayo Manyinyi (born 1 July 1967), is a Tanzanian politician presently serves as a Chama Cha Mapinduzi's Member of Parliament for Musoma Town Constituency since November 2015.
