= Emmanuel Mwakasaka =

Tanzanian politician

Honorable Emmanuel Mwakasaka MP

Member of Parliament
- Incumbent
- Assumed office 2020
- Preceded by: Ismail Aden Rage
- Constituency: Tabora Urban Constituency

Personal details
- Born: Emmanuel Adamson Mwakasaka; December 12, 1960 (age 64) Tabora Region, Tanganyika Territory (now in Tanzania)
- Party: Party of the Revolution
- Education: Magomeni Primary School; Kigurunyembe Secondary School
- Alma mater: Open University of Tanzania (LL.B) (LL.M)

Emmanuel Adamson Mwakasaka (born December 12, 1960), is a Tanzanian politician who presently serves as a Chama Cha Mapinduzi's Member of Parliament for Tabora Urban Constituency since November 2020.
