= Dar es Salaam University College of Education =

University in Tanzania

Coordinates: 6°50′59″S 39°16′20″E

- Swahili: Chuo Kikuu Kishiriki cha Elimu Dar es Salaam
- Other name: DUCE
- Motto: Quality Education for All
- Type: Public
- Established: 2005; 21 years ago
- Parent institution: University of Dar es Salaam
- Principal: Prof. Stephen Oswald Maluka
- Location: Dar es Salaam, Tanzania
- Campus: Urban
- Website: www.duce.ac.tz

The Dar es Salaam University College of Education (DUCE) is a constituent college of the University of Dar es Salaam in Tanzania. DUCE is located in Miburani ward, Temeke municipality close to Tanzania National Stadium. It is one of the higher learning institutions in Tanzania established in 2005 as part of the Tanzanian Government development policy to extend secondary school education in Tanzania. The core activities of the college is teaching, conducting research and offering public consultation.

== Management ==
The college is managed by the Principal who is assisted by two deputies, the Deputy Principal (Academic) and Deputy Principal (Administration). Currently, the Principal is Prof. Stephen Oswald Maluka while the Deputy Principal (Academic) is Dr. Christine Raphael and the Deputy Principal (Administration) is Prof. Method Samwel.

== Faculties ==
- Faculty of Science
- Faculty of Education
- Faculty of Humanities and Social Sciences

=== Faculty of Science ===
The Faculty of Science offers Bachelor of Science with Education degree programme with various subject combinations emanating from within the Faculty and from the Faculty of Humanities and Social Sciences.

Such subject combinations include:

- Chemistry & physics
- Chemistry & biology
- Physics & mathematics
- Information sciences & mathematics
- Chemistry & mathematics
- Biology & geography
- Physics & geography
- Physics & biology

== Notable alumni ==
- Irene Tarimo Researcher and Lecturer at OUT

== See also ==
- List of universities and colleges in Tanzania
