= Najmuddin (politician) =

Indian politician

Member of the Bihar Legislative Assembly
- In office 1980–1990
- Preceded by: Islamuddin Baghi
- Succeeded by: Islamuddin Baghi
- In office 1969–1977
- Preceded by: Dilip Narayan Jha
- Succeeded by: Islamuddin Bagi
- Constituency: Bahadurganj

Personal details
- Born: 2 January 1928 Gangi, Dist- Purnea (now- Kishanganj ), Bihar
- Died: 25 October 2013 (aged 85) Gangi, Kishanganj
- Party: Indian National Congress
- Spouse: Mehrun Nisha Begum
- Children: 8
- Education: Patna Science College (M.Sc.)
- As of April, 2019

Najmuddin (1928-2013) was an Indian social reformer and politician who was active in politics for four decades, and was the Indian National Congress member of the Bihar Legislative Assembly from Bahadurganj constituency.

== Early life ==
Najmuddin was born at Gangi village in Purnia district on 2 January 1928. He received his Master of Science in Mathematics from Science College Patna University, Patna. He was awarded Gold Medal. Before entering active politics, he worked as an Assistant Principal in Russel High School Bahadurganj, Kishanganj.

== Political career ==
=== Member of Legislative Assembly ===
He was elected as a Member of the Legislative Assembly from Bahadurganj Vidhan Sabha constituency in 1969 and 1972. He was placed second in the 1977 elections and won the seat again in 1980 and 1985. He was again placed second in 1990.

=== Positions held ===
He was appointed General Secretary of the Bihar Pradesh Congress Committee (BPCC) in 1982 and worked with late Shri Dumer Lal Baitha during the tenure of his Presidency. In 1991 he was appointed president of the District Core Committee (DCC) Kishanganj. He was appointed and worked as Chairman of Bihar State Panchayat Finance Corporation in 1981 to 1989. He was appointed Chairman for five years of Bihar State Electricity Advisory Board Purnia Circle in 1972, also elected Hon. Joint Secretary and Director of the Purnia district. District Central Co-operative Bank (DCCB) Ltd. Purnia several times between 1969 and 1995. Also appointed Vice-Chairman of the District Board, Purnia Bihar 1974. He died on 25 October 2013.

=== Social Activities ===
- Founder of public Library at Gangi Hat.
- Founder and Secretary of National Academy High School Gangi Hat, Kishanganj.
- Founder and Secretary of Nehru College, Bahadurganj, Dist. Kishanganj.
- Founder and Secretary of Bahadurganj College Bahadurganj, Dist. Kishanganj.
- President of Najmuddin Yuva Mandal (NGO), Gangi Hat.
- President of Mehrun Nisha Mahila Vikas Mandal.
