= Stock Exchange of Visions =

The Stock Exchange of Visions is a project initiated in 2006 by Fabrica, Benetton's research center. It gathers visionaries from diverse nationalities and cultures, who hail from a wide range of specialties, to provide insight into their vision for the future.

Artists, sociologists, activists, scientists and others have answered a questionnaire designed to explore their idea of the future regarding our culture, environment, resources, economy and society. Stock Exchange of Visions aims to contribute to the awareness of our relationship with the planet while supplying positive and thoughtful answers regarding major global issues.

Stock Exchange of Visions consists of an interactive installation and website which allows the participant to access the growing content of the project and interact with it. The installation is a site-specific knowledge hub while the website provides global access to the visions of the future collected by the project.

== Installation ==
The Stock Exchange of Visions installation creates an on-site, interactive knowledge experience. The installation features a revolutionary interactive menu to access the visions of the future, which are projected onto a life-size video screen. The life-size video screen aims to create a dialogue sphere between the selected visionary and the installation participant.

The Stock Exchange of Visions installation is a traveling installation, which has been presented at the main cultural outlets of Europe. The installation was first seen at the Centre Georges Pompidou in Paris (2006), the second presentation will be the Trienale of Milan (2007). The objective of this traveling installation is to allow visitors to have an interactive physical experience with the visions of the future, while the website provides constant global access to the content of the project.

== Visionaries ==
Stock Exchange of Visions has collected the video interviews of the following Visionaries:

- Abdourahman Waberi
- Grethel Aguilar
- Alberto Alesina
- Angel Almendros
- Pilar Andres
- Nima Arkani-Hamed
- Francisco Arredondo
- Mario Botta
- Jared Breiterman
- Alan Burdick
- Ernesto Cardenal
- Azurra Carpo
- Peter Cavanagh
- Alan Cooper
- Herman Daly
- Norihiko Dan
- Emilio Del Giucide
- Bita Fayyazi
- Amy Franceschini
- Luis Enrique Godoy
- Al Gore
- Sven Erik Jorgensen
- Julie Lasky
- Ervin László
- Joep van Lieshout
- Ezio Manzini
- Eva Mattes
- Franco Mattes
- Bruce Mau
- Gianantonio Melli
- Eduardo Moron
- Felix Müller
- Youssou N'Dour
- Wallace J. Nochols
- Piergiorgio Odifreddi
- Sergio Ramírez
- Ignacio Ramonet
- Godfrey Reggio
- Wolfgang Sachs
- Vandana Shiva
- Richard Slaughter
- Enzo Tiezzi
- Tathagat Avatar Tulsi
- Robert Ulanowicz
- Salvatore Veca
- Massimo Vignelli
- Jin Xing
