= Tolly Mbwette =

Tanzanian academic (1956-2020)

Professor Tolly Mbwette
- Born: 8 June 1956; Irambo, Mbeya Rural District, Tanganyika Territory (now Tanzania)
- Died: 2 July 2020 (aged 64); Upanga, Dar es Salaam, Tanzania
- Resting place: Irambo, Mbeya Region
- Education: University of Dar es Salaam, Imperial College London, IHE Delft Institute for Water Education
- Years active: 1981–2020
- Organizations: Open University of Tanzania, UDSM
- Children: 3
- Website: www.mbwettelibrary.com

Tolly Salvatory Augustine Mbwette (8 June 1956 – 2 July 2020) was a Tanzanian academic, engineer and educator. He held various positions in national and international institutions of higher learning, including that of vice chancellor of the Open University of Tanzania. He was a team leader for various multi-disciplinary research teams responsible for drinking and wastewater treatment systems that rely on bio-systems.

Mbwette participated in a number of co-operation programmes between European and American institutions and African universities.

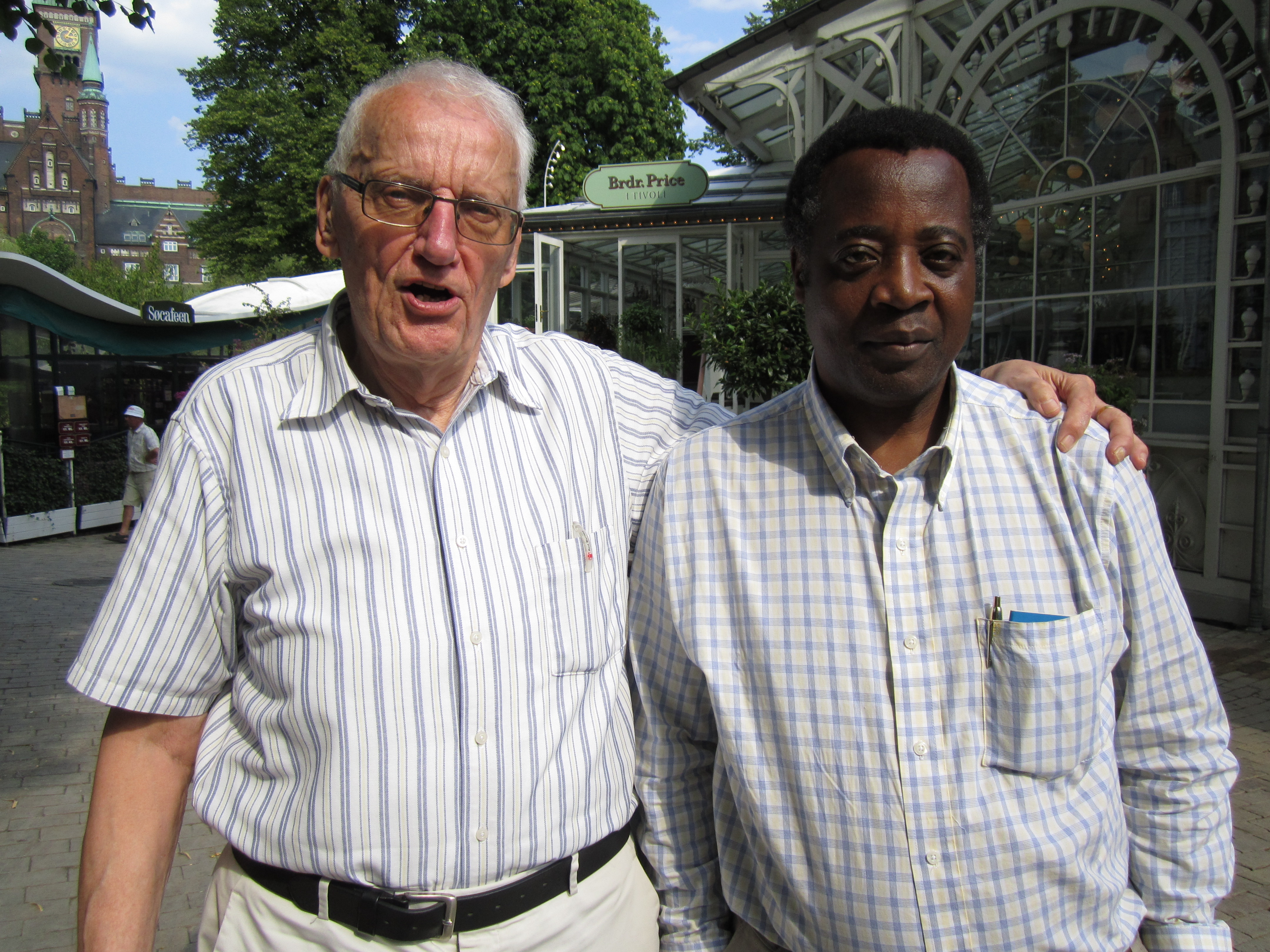
Prof. Tolly Mbwette with Prof. Sven Erik Jorgensen in Denmark

== Education background ==
Mbwette obtained a Bachelor of Science degree in civil engineering from the University of Dar es Salaam in 1981 and a postgraduate diploma in sanitary engineering from the International Institute for Hydraulic and Environmental Engineering in the Netherlands the following year. He went on to obtain a Master of Engineering degree in Civil and Environmental studies from the University of Dar es Salaam in 1984 and a PhD in public health and Environmental studies from the Imperial College of Science and Technology in 1989.

== Career ==
Mbwette held various managerial positions in institutions of higher learning, starting with a position as associate dean for research, publications and postgraduate studies in the Faculty of Engineering at the University of Dar es Salaam (UDSM), after which he assisted the UDSM vice chancellor in coordinating the university's Institutional Transformation Program for eight years between July 1994 and July 2002.

From January 2004 to April 2005, he was deputy vice chancellor for academics at the Open University of Tanzania and went on to serve as vice chancellor of the university from 13 April 2005 to 12 April 2015. He was chairman of the Inter-University Council for East Africa's Governing Board for two years and served as its vice chairperson from 2008 to 2010. He was the founder and chairman of TERNET Council between 2007 and 2010. Between 2007 and 2009, Mbwette was the chairman of the Tanzania Commission for Universities. He served as vice chairperson of the Governing Board of the African Council of Distance Learning between 2008 and 2011.

From 2009, he was an honorary advisor to the Commonwealth of Learning. In July 2011, he was elected President of the African Council of Distance Learning for a period of three years. Mbwette conducted extensive research and consultancy in the areas of environmental engineering, information and communications technology, institutional reforms and environmental management. He served as Governing Board member of the Association of African Universities. He was also a chairperson of the university council of Kampala International University in Uganda and board chairman of the Tanzania Telecommunications Corporation.

In 2015, Mbwette opened a public library known as the Mbwette Professional Library, which holds a collection of research and reading materials. The library is responsible for directly supporting the national and international research community.

== Personal life ==
Mbwette died at Aga Khan Hospital in Dar es Salaam on 2 July 2020.

== Selected works ==
- Jowi, James Otieno; Mbwette, Tolly (January 2017). "The Role of Research Centres and Networks". In Jane Knight; Emnet Tadesse Woldegiorgis (eds.). Regionalization of African Higher Education. Brill. pp. 161–174. ISBN 9789463009560.
- Mbwette, Tolly Salvator Augustin (1989). The performance of fabric protected slow sand filters (PhD thesis). Imperial College London. hdl:10044/1/47566.
- Mbwette, Tolly S. (2018). "Experiences with slow sand filters in Tanzania". In Ince, M (ed.). Water and sanitation in Africa: Proceedings of the 11th WEDC International Conference, Dar Es Salaam, Tanzania, 15-19 April 1985. Loughborough University. pp. 93–96.
- Tarimo, Irene; Yohana, Lawi; Senzia, M. A.; Mbogo, M.; Mbwette, Tolly S. A. (December 2014). "Modelling of Municipal Wastewater Treatment in a System Consisting of Waste Stabilization Ponds, Constructed Wastelands and Fish Ponds in Tanzania". In Sven Erik Jørgensen; Ni-Bin Chang; Fu-Liu Xu (eds.). Ecological Modelling and Engineering of Lakes and Wetlands. Elsevier. doi:10.1016/B978-0-444-63249-4.00025-7 – via ResearchGate.
- Mbwette, TSA (2012). "Seventeen Years of Delivery of Open and Distance Education by The Open University of Tanzania (OUT) in East Africa and Beyond". Huria: Journal of the Open University of Tanzania.

Academic offices
Preceded by Geoffrey Mmari	Vice Chancellor of Open University of Tanzania; 2004–2015	Succeeded by Elifas Bisanda
