= Henry Rimisho =

Tanzanian architect (born 1969)

Henry M. Rimisho
- Born: 26 January 1969 (age 57); Kinondoni, Dar es Salaam, Tanzania
- Other name: Henry Mtenga Rimisho
- Occupations: Lecturer, architect
- Relatives: Irene Tarimo

Academic background
- Education: Pontifical Urban University (B.A); Ardhi University (M.A) (PhD)
- Doctoral advisors: Livin Henry Mosha, Wilbard Kombe

Henry M. Rimisho (born 26 January 1969) is a Tanzanian architect and lecturer from the Department of Architecture, School of Architecture, Construction, Economics and Management at Ardhi University in Dar es Salaam. He is also a missionary priest from the Congregation of The Apostles of Jesus based in Nairobi, Kenya.

== Biography ==
Rimisho was born in Kinondoni, Dar es Salaam, in the United Republic of Tanzania, to Mr. and Mrs. Jacob Rimisho. In 1994, he attended Pontifical Urban University for a bachelor's degree in philosophy and 2000 he attained a bachelor's degree in theology. From 2012, he also attained a bachelor's degree, in 2014 a master's degree and 2020 a doctoral (PhD) in architecture from Ardhi University.

== Career ==
Rimisho is a member of Architects Association of Tanzania and lectures mostly in urban development and housing, architectural design studio, building materials, profession practice, building service and research methodology.

== Selected works ==
- Rimisho, Henry; Mosha, Livin (November 2018). Evolution and Demise of Church Architecture from Ancient to Present Time: The Case of Catholic Archidiocese of Dar es Salaam Churches in Tanzania. Semantic Scholar. S2CID 212505334.
