= Bita Fayyazi =

Iranian female artist (born 1962)

- بیتا فیاضی
- Born: 1962 (age 63–64); Tehran, Iran
- Known for: Sculptor, ceramics, installation art

Bita Fayyazi (b.1962 in Tehran; Persian: بیتا فیاضی) is an Iranian visual artist and pioneer in the field of Iranian public art projects. She is known for her theatrical, large-scale work. Fayyazi lives, and teaches at a private studio in Tehran.

== Biography ==
Fayyazi has more than 15 years work experience in the fields of ceramics and sculpture, with much of her work categorized as "dark ceramics" due to the subject matter. She lived in England for a period of seven years, and returned to Iran in 1980.

She participated in the Iranian Pavilion at the 51st Venice Biennale in 2005, and has exhibited at, among others, Espace Louis Vuitton, Paris (2008 and 2010), the Museum of Modern Art in Freiburg (2007), and the Pergamon Museum, Berlin (2008). She has exhibited in two group exhibitions at Thaddaeus Ropac Gallery, Paris, notably in Be Crowned with Laurel in Oblivion (2010) with Ramin and Rokni Haerizadeh and the Stock Exchange of Visions project in 2007.

== See also ==
- Modern and contemporary art in Iran
- List of Iranian women artists
