= Elifas Bisanda =

Vice Chancellor of Open University of Tanzania

Elifas Tozo Bisanda
- Born: 10 October 1956 (age 70); Kigoma Region, Tanzania

Academic background
- Education: University of Dar es Salaam; University of Bath; Cranfield University

Academic work
- Discipline: Mechanical engineering
- Institutions: Open University of Tanzania

Elifas Tozo Bisanda (born 10 October 1956) is a Tanzanian academic and professor. He has served as a professor of mechanical engineering and the vice-chancellor of The Open University of Tanzania since 2015. He is currently the chairperson of the UNESCO National Commission of the United Republic of Tanzania.

He is the former chairperson of the Governing Council of the Institute of Adult Education in Tanzania, the chairman of the Council of Morogoro Vocational Teachers College, and a member of the University of Arusha Council and the Police Training Board. He is a chairman of SIDO (Small Industries Development Organization) in Tanzania. Bisanda is also a board member of Association of African Universities.

Academic offices
Preceded by Tolly Mbwette	Vice Chancellor of Open University of Tanzania; 2015–present	Incumbent
