= Ram Parikshan Roy =

Indian botanist (1920–1997)

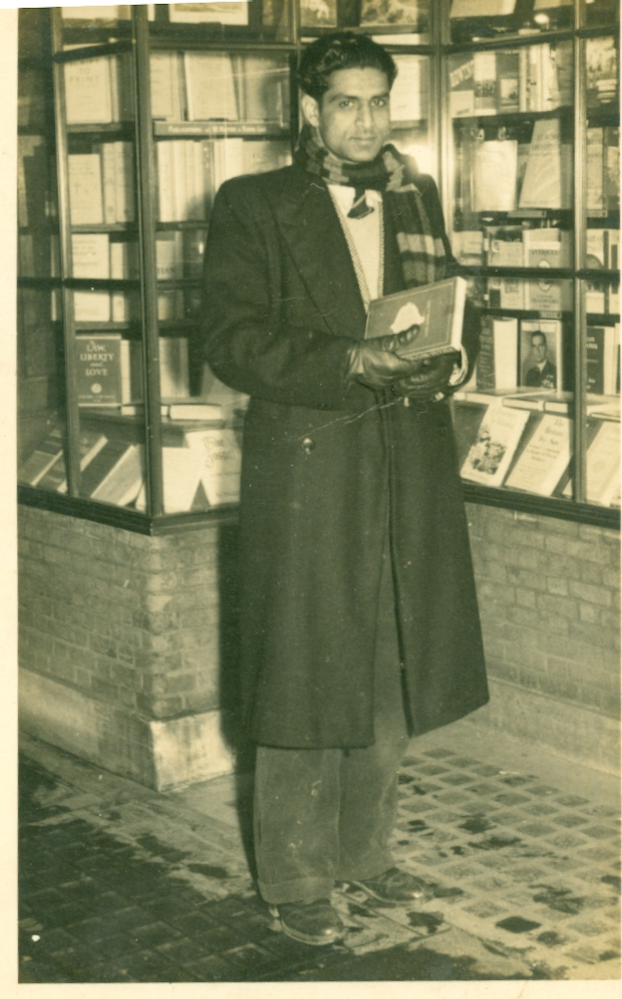
Roy in 1951

Ram Parikshan Roy (1920–1997) was an Indian Professor of Botany. He made significant contributions to the fields of genomics analysis, cytogenetics, plant breeding, tissue culture and cytotaxonomy.

== Early life and education ==
Roy was born in Gangapur, Bihar, India in 1920. He started his career as a lecturer at Patna Science College in 1947. He obtained his degree of PhD from University of Cambridge in 1953.

== Career ==
Roy became a Professor and Head of Botany at Patna University at a young age of 37. Later he held the positions of Dean of Science and Coordinator, UGC Centre of Special Assistance in Cytogenetics at Patna. He became CSIR (Council of Scientific and Industrial Research) Emeritus Scientist in 1982.

== Research and publications ==
Roy conducted a survey of local fauna in Patna and brought out a monograph entitled Trees of Patna in 1948. He established an active school on Cytogenetics of plants in the fifties at Patna University. Further he started an important and ambitious program on Cytogenetics of Indian cucurbits in early 1960s.

- Trivedi, R. N.; Roy, R. P. (1972-06-01). "Cytological studies in some species of Momordica". Genetica. 43 (2): 282–291. doi:10.1007/BF00123635. ISSN 1573-6857. S2CID 22686302.
- Agarwal, P. K.; Roy, R. P. (1976-01-01). "Natural Polyploids in Cucurbitaceae I. Cytogenetical Studies in Triploid Momordica Dioica Roxb". Caryologia. 29 (1): 7–13. doi:10.1080/00087114.1976.10796644. ISSN 0008-7114.
- Roy, R.P.; Saran, Sunil; Dutt, Bithi (1991-01-01). "Cytogenetics of the Cucurbitaceae". Developments in Plant Genetics and Breeding. 2: 181–199. doi:10.1016/B978-0-444-88260-8.50015-X. ISBN 9780444882608. ISSN 0168-7972.
- Trivedi, R. N.; Roy, R. P. (1970). "Cytological Studies in Cucumis and Citrullus". Cytologia. 35 (4): 561–569. doi:10.1508/cytologia.35.561.

== Awards and recognition ==
Roy won Birbal Sahni Gold Medal in 1973 and Jawaharlal Nehru Fellowship in 1975. He was elected Fellow of the National Academy of Sciences, India, Indian Botanical Society, Indian Society of Genetics, and Plant Breeding Society (London). He became President of Indian Science Congress in 1972. Roy was the founder Secretary of the Society of Cytologists and Geneticists (SCG).
