= Patna Science College =

College in Bihar

- Type: Undergraduate and Postgraduate College
- Established: 1927; 99 years ago
- Affiliations: Patna University
- Principal: Dr. Alka Yadav
- Location: Patna, Bihar, India; 25.6179°N 85.1698°E
- Campus: Urban
- Website: Patna Science College

Patna Science College, established in 1927, is one of the oldest science colleges in Patna, Bihar, India. It is affiliated to Patna University, and offers undergraduate and postgraduate courses in science.

== History ==
Patna Science College is an institute of higher education in science which began in 1927 as the science department of Patna University. It was opened on 15 November 1928 by the then Viceroy, Lord Irwin. As of 2010, the college offers courses in physics, chemistry, botany, zoology, geology, mathematics, statistics and management, as well as vocational courses. It provides three-year BSc (Honours) and MSc courses in the aforementioned subjects. The college used to offer 10+2 courses, including Junior school, High school and Junior College education, but these have been discontinued.

== Location ==
The college is located between Patna University's main library and the National Institute of Technology Patna on Ashok Rajpath, Patna. It is situated on the banks of the River Ganga.

== Hostel ==
There are six hostels for students that include Faraday House, Cavendish House, Newton House, Ramanujan Bhawan C.V. Raman, and Bhabha Hostel. The Girls' Hostel is shared with other Patna University colleges, and it is next to the college. Students also take up residence in nearby private accommodation. Each department has its own library as well as its own building. Students also have access to the Patna University library.

== Notable alumni ==
- Prashant Kishor, Founder of Jan Suraaj and Political Strategist.
- H. C. Verma, Renowned Physicist
- Rajiv Gauba, Former Cabinet Secretary of India
- Abhayanand, ex-DGP Bihar
- Upendra Kushwaha, Former Minister of State for Human Resource Development, Government of India.
- Ravindra Kumar Sinha, Biologist
- Shatrughan Sinha, film actor turned politician
- Tathagat Avatar Tulsi, Physicist, known as a child prodigy
- Vashishtha Narayan Singh, Mathematician
- Najmuddin, 4 times MLA, Bahadurganj
- Ashwini Kumar Choubey, Politician
- Sushil Kumar Modi, Deputy CM Bihar

== Notable faculty ==
- Ravindra Kumar Sinha, Biology
- H. C. Verma, Physics
- Dr. K. C. Sinha, Mathematics
- Ram Parikshan Roy, Botany
