= John Mrosso =

Tanzanian judge

Honorable Justice John Aloyce Mrosso

3rd IJA Governing Council Chairperson
- President: Jakaya Kikwete
- Preceded by: Mohamed Chande Othman
- Succeeded by: Dr. Gerald Ndika

Judge of the Court of Appeal of Tanzania
- In office 2001–2008
- Nominated by: Barnabas A. Samatta
- Appointed by: Benjamin Mkapa

Personal details
- Born: Kilimanjaro Region, Tanganyika Territory
- Citizenship: Tanzanian
- Relatives: Irene Tarimo (sister)
- Profession: Judge; Lawyer

John Aloyce Mrosso (born in Kilimanjaro Region) is a Tanzanian Judge and Former Governing Council Chairman of the Institute of Judicial Administration in Tanzania. He served as a Judge in the High Court of Tanzania and as a Justice of Appeal at the Court of Appeal of the United Republic of Tanzania from 2001 to 2008.
