= Ecological Modelling =

- Discipline: Theoretical ecology
- Language: English
- Edited by: Brian D. Fath

Publication details
- History: 1975–present
- Publisher: Elsevier
- Frequency: Monthly
- Impact factor: 2.363 (2016)

Standard abbreviations
- ISO 4: Ecol. Model.

Indexing
- CODEN: ECMODT
- ISSN: 0304-3800
- OCLC no.: 780565190

Links
- Journal homepage; Online archive

Ecological Modelling is a monthly peer-reviewed scientific journal covering the use of ecosystem models in the field of ecology. It was founded in 1975 by Sven Erik Jørgensen and is published by Elsevier. The current editor-in-chief is Brian D. Fath (Towson University). According to the Journal Citation Reports, the journal has a 2016 impact factor of 2.363.
