= Mohammad Anzar Nayeemi =

Indian politician

Mohammad Anzar Nayeemi is an Indian politician and a member of the Bihar Legislative Assembly from the Bahadurganj constituency. He was elected as an All India Majlis-e-Ittehadul Muslimeen (AIMIM) candidate in the 2020 Bihar Legislative Assembly election, but later joined the Rashtriya Janata Dal (RJD).

== Early Background ==
Mohammad Anzar Nayeemi was born to Nayeemuddin Ahmad on 3 February 1972. He comes from an influential family of Bahadurganj. His father Nayeemuddin Ahmad was a social activist and a key founder member of Bahadurganj College, Bahadurganj and Darul Uloom Bahadurganj which later brought revolution in the field of education.

He did his schooling from Russell High School Bahadurganj and holds a degree in commerce (B.Com.) from B.N. Mandal University, Madhepura.

He had contested election representing RJD in 2010 Bihar Assembly election, but did not finish on top, and recontested in 2020 representing AIMIM and won with huge margin.
