= Bahadurganj Assembly constituency =

Coordinates: 26°15′19″N 87°48′49″E

Bahadurganj
- Constituency No. 52 for the Bihar Legislative Assembly

Constituency details
- Country: India
- Region: East India
- State: Bihar
- Division: Purnia
- District: Kishanganj
- Lok Sabha constituency: Kishanganj
- Established: 1951
- Total electors: 301,120

Member of Legislative Assembly
- 18th Bihar Legislative Assembly
- Incumbent Tauseef Alam
- Party: AIMIM
- Alliance: None
- Elected year: 2025

Bahadurganj Assembly constituency is an assembly constituency in Kishanganj district in the Indian state of Bihar.

== Overview ==
As per Delimitation of Parliamentary and Assembly constituencies Order, 2008, No 52 Bahadurganj Assembly constituency is composed of the following: Bahadurganj and Terhagachh community development blocks; Patharghatti, Ghangra and Lachhmipur gram panchayats of Dighalbank CD Block.

Bahadurganj Assembly constituency is part of No 10 Kishanganj (Lok Sabha constituency).

== Members of the Legislative Assembly ==
List of Members of Legislative Assembly from Bahadurganj Assembly Constituency.

Year	Name	Party
1952	Mohammad Ahsan	Indian National Congress
1957	Lakhan Lal Kapoor	Praja Socialist Party
1962	Rafique Alam	Indian National Congress
1967	Dilip Narayan Jha	Praja Socialist Party
1969	Najmuddin	Indian National Congress
1972	Najmuddin	Indian National Congress
1977	Islamuddin Bagi	Janata Party
1980	Najmuddin	Indian National Congress (I)
1985	Najmuddin	Indian National Congress
1990	Islamuddin Bagi	Janata Dal
1995	Avadh Bihari Singh	Bharatiya Janata Party
2000	Jahidur Rahman	Indian National Congress
2005	Tauseef Alam	Independent
2005	Tauseef Alam	Indian National Congress
2010	Tauseef Alam	Indian National Congress
2015	Tauseef Alam	Indian National Congress
2020	Mohammad Anzar Nayeemi	All India Majlis-e-Ittehadul Muslimeen
2020	Mohammad Anzar Nayeemi	Rashtriya Janata Dal
2025	Tauseef Alam	All India Majlis-e-Ittehadul Muslimeen

== Election results ==
=== 2025 ===
2025 Bihar Legislative Assembly election: Bahadurganj
Party	Candidate	Votes	%	±%
AIMIM	Tauseef Alam	87,315	40.21	▼9.56
INC	Mohammed Masawar Alam	58,589	26.98	▲9.47
LJP(RV)	Mohammad Kalimuddin	57,195	26.34	
JSP	Varun Kumar Singh	3,193	1.47	
NOTA	None of the above	3,887	1.79	▼0.95
Majority		28,726	13.23	▼12.98
Turnout		217,155	74.59	▲15.63
AIMIM gain from RJD		Swing		

=== 2020 ===
Bihar Assembly election, 2020: Bahadurganj
Party	Candidate	Votes	%	±%
AIMIM	Mohammad Anzar Nayeemi	85,855	49.77	
VIP	Lakhan Lal Pandit	40,640	23.56	
INC	Md. Tauseef Alam	30,204	17.51	▼16.05
SS	Chandan Kumar Yadav	2,647	1.53	▲1.27
JAP(L)	Mohammad Mansoor Alam	2,194	1.27	▼19.82
Bahujan Maha Party	Mohammad Musfik Ala	1,825	1.06	
Independent	Hari Mohan Singh	1,691	0.98	▼0.16
NOTA	None of the above	4,729	2.74	▲2.09
Majority		45,215	26.21	▲17.47
Turnout		172,490	58.96	▼3.41
AIMIM gain from INC		Swing		

=== 2015 ===
2015 Bihar Legislative Assembly election: Bahadurganj
Party	Candidate	Votes	%	±%
INC	Md. Tauseef Alam	53,533	33.56	
BJP	Awadh Bihari Singh	39,591	24.82	
JAP(L)	Mohammed Masawar Alam	33,638	21.09	
SP	Hasnain Mirza	8,230	5.16	
Independent	Barun Kumar Singh	4,901	3.07	
JMM	Hasan Javed	2,435	1.53	
BSP	Parmeshwar Prasad Sinha	2,428	1.52	
NCP	Md Mansoor Alam	2,422	1.52	
Independent	Hari Mohan Singh	1,816	1.14	
Independent	Suresh Prasad Mandal	1,684	1.06	
Independent	Raj Kumar Sah	1,674	1.05	
NOTA	None of the above	1,033	0.65	
Majority		13,942	8.74	
Turnout		159,520	62.37	

=== 2010 ===
In November 2010 and October 2005 state assembly elections, Md. Tousif Alam of Congress won the Bahadurganj assembly seat defeating his nearest rivals Mohammad Maswar Alam of JD(U) and Sikandar Singh, Independent, respectively. Contests in most years were multi cornered but only winners and runners up are being mentioned. Md. Tousif Alam contesting as an independent candidate defeated Zahidur Rahman of Congress in February 2005. Zahidur Rahman of Congress defeated Awadh Bihari Singh of BJP in 2000. Awadh Bihari Singh of BJP defeated Zahidur Rahman, Independent, in 1995. Islamuddin Bagi of JD defeated Najmuddin of Congress in 1990. Najmuddin of Congress defeated Shital Prasad Sinha, Independent, in 1985 and Kalimuddin, Independent, in 1980. Islamuddin Bagi of JP defeated Md. Nazmuddin in 1977.
