= Abdourahman Waberi =

Writer and academic from Djibouti

Abdourahman A. Waberi
- Cabdiraxmaan Waaberi
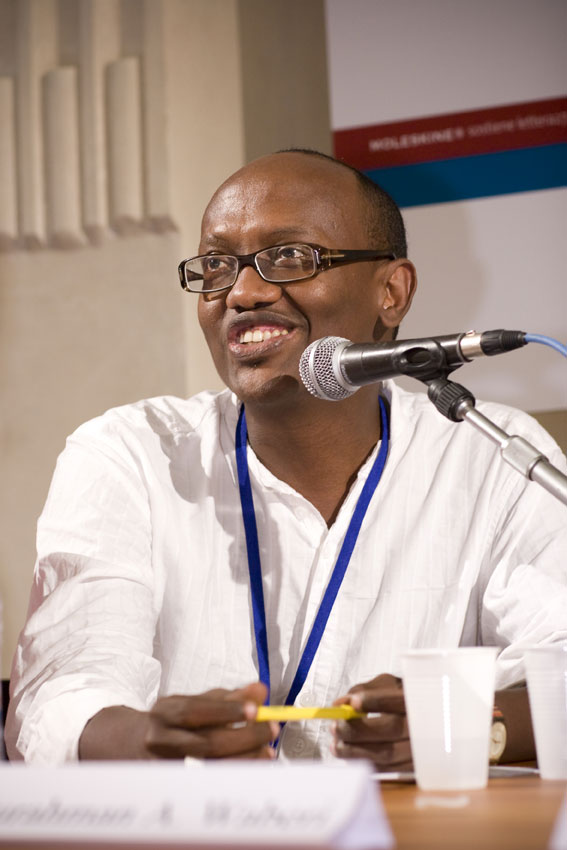
- Waberi at the Festivaletteratura, Mantua (2008)
- Born: 20 July 1965 (age 61); Djibouti City, Djibouti
- Writing career
- Language: Somali, English and French

Abdourahman A. Waberi (Somali: Cabdiraxmaan Waaberi) is a novelist, essayist, poet, academic, and short-story writer from Djibouti.

== Early life ==
Abdourahman Waberi was born in Djibouti City in the French Somali Coast, the current Republic of Djibouti. He went to France in 1985 to study English literature. Waberi worked as a literary consultant for Editions Le Serpent à plumes, Paris, and as a literary critic for Le Monde Diplomatique. He has been a member of the International Jury for the Lettre Ulysses Award for the Art of Reportage (Berlin, Germany), 2003 & 2004.

== Career ==
Waberi worked as an English teacher at Caen, France, where he has lived for most of his time since 1985. He was awarded with several honours including the Stefan-George-Preis 2006, Heinrich-Heine-Universität, the Grand prix littéraire d'Afrique noire in 1996 and the Prix biennal " Mandat pour la liberté " – offered by PEN France, 1998. In 2005, he was chosen amongst the "50 Writers of Future" by the French literary magazine Lire.

From 2006 to 2007, Waberi lived in Berlin as a guest of the DAAD. In 2007, he was a Donald and Susan Newhouse Center Humanities Fellow at Wellesley College, USA. His work has been translated into more than ten languages. In 2007, Waberi participated in the international Stock Exchange of Visions project. In 2010, he was a William F. Podlich Distinguished Fellow and a visiting professor at Claremont McKenna College, California, a jury member of the International Dublin Literary Award and an Academie de France Villa Medici fellow in Roma, Italy. In May and June 2012, he was a visiting professor at the University of Innsbruck, Austria. His novel Transit was a finalist for the Best Translated Book Award (2013). Nancy Naomi Carlson is a 2013 recipient of an NEA Literature Translation Fellowship for translating his book of poetry. He teaches now French and Francophone Studies and Creative Writing at George Washington University, Washington DC.

During the fall semester of 2023, he held the visiting professor chair of "World Literature" at the University of Bern in Switzerland. The subject of his weekly seminar was "Afrofuturism" – the artistic movement that explores identities, forms of expression, and future visions within the African diaspora.

== Bibliography ==
=== Novels ===
- Balbala (Serpent à plumes, 1998)
- Moisson de crânes (Serpent à plumes, 2000). Harvest of Skulls, trans. Dominic Richard David Thomas (Indiana University Press, 2016)
- Rift routes rails : variations romanesques (Gallimard, 2001)
- Transit (Gallimard, 2003). Transit, trans. David and Nicole Ball (Indiana University Press, 2012)
- Aux États-Unis d'Afrique (Lattès, 2006). In the United States of Africa, trans. David and Nicole Ball with preface by Percival Everett (University of Nebraska Press, 2009)
- Passage des larmes (Lattès, 2009). Passage of Tears, trans. David and Nicole Ball (Seagull Books, 2011)
- La Divine Chanson (Éditions Zulma, 2015). The Divine Song, trans. David and Nicole Ball (Seagull Books, 2020)
- Pourquoi tu danses quand tu marches ? (Lattès, 2019). Why Do You Dance When You Walk? trans. David and Nicole Ball (Cassava Republic Press, 2022)
- Dis-moi pour qui j’existe ? (Lattès, 2022)

=== Short stories and novellas ===
- Le Pays sans ombre (Serpent à plumes, 1994). The Land Without Shadows, trans. Jeanne Garane with preface by Nuruddin Farah (University of Virginia Press, 2005)
- Cahier nomade (Serpent à plumes, 1996). "Nomad's Book"

=== Poetry ===
- Les nomades, mes frères vont boire à la Grande Ourse (Éditions Pierron, 2000). The Nomads, My Brothers, Go Out to Drink from the Big Dipper, trans. Nancy Naomi Carlson (Seagull Books, 2015)
- Mon nom est aube (Éditions Vents d'ailleurs, 2016). Naming the Dawn, trans. Nancy Naomi Carlson (Seagull Books, 2018)
- Quand on n'a que la terre (Éditions Points, 2022). When We Only Have the Earth, trans. Nancy Naomi Carlson (University of Nebraska Press, 2025)

=== Other ===
- L'Œil nomade : voyage à travers le pays Djibouti (CCFAR/L'Harmattan, 1997). "Nomad's Eye"

== Awards and honours ==
- 1994: Prix Henri Cornélus pour la Nouvelle francophone for Le Pays sans ombre
- 1994: Prix Albert Bernard for Le Pays sans ombre
- 1996: Grand prix littéraire d'Afrique noire for Cahier nomade
- 1997: Prix « Mandat pour la liberté » du PEN Club français
- 1997: Prix du Festival du Premier Roman de Chambéry (collective prize) for Balbala
- 2000: Finalist for the Caine Prize
- 2004: Prix littéraire de la Ville de Caen, jury lycéen
- 2006: Guest of the DAAD Artists-in-Berlin Programme 2006–2007
- 2006: Stefan-George-Preis for In den Vereinigten Staaten von Afrika
- 2015: Prix Louis-Guilloux for La Divine Chanson
