= Sven Erik Jørgensen =

Danish ecologist and chemist

Professor Sven Erik Jorgensen
- Born: 29 August 1934; Copenhagen, Denmark
- Died: 5 March 2016 (aged 81); Copenhagen, Denmark

Academic background
- Education: Technical University of Denmark; Karlsruhe Institute of Technology; University of Copenhagen

Academic work
- Discipline: Chemistry, ecology
- Doctoral students: Villy Christensen, Irene Tarimo

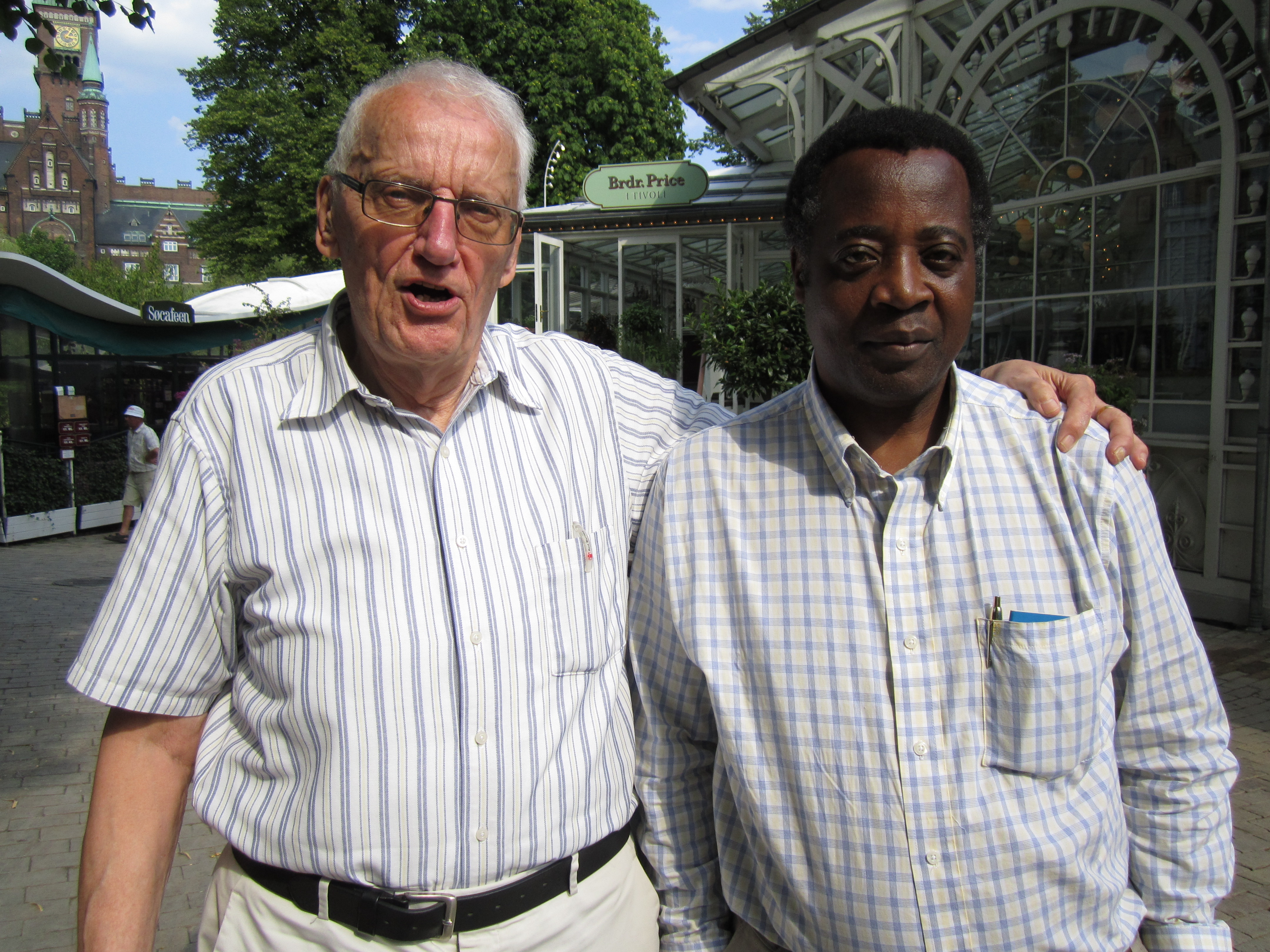
Jørgensen with Tolly Mbwette in Tivoli (Copenhagen)

Sven Erik Jørgensen (29 August 1934 – 5 March 2016) was an ecologist and chemist from Denmark.

== Academic degrees and honors ==
In 1958, Jørgensen was awarded a Master of Science in chemical engineering from the Technical University of Denmark, then Doctor of Environmental Engineering (Karlsruhe Institute of Technology) and Doctor of Science in ecological modelling (University of Copenhagen). He taught courses in ecological modelling in 32 countries. After his retirement, he became professor emeritus in environmental chemistry at the University of Copenhagen.

He was an honourable doctor at Coimbra University, Portugal and at University of Dar es Salaam, Tanzania.

He received several awards: Ruđer Bošković award, Prigogine Prize, Blaise Pascal Medal, Einstein professorship at the Chinese Academy of Sciences and the Santa Chiara Prize for multidisciplinary teaching. In 2004, together with William J. Mitsch, he was awarded the Stockholm Water Prize.

== Works ==
In 1975, Jørgensen founded a journal, Ecological Modelling, and in 1978 he founded ISEM, the International Society of Ecological Modelling.

He published 366 papers, of which 275 were in peer-reviewed international journals, and edited or authored 76 books. Several have been translated into other languages (Chinese, Russian, Spanish, and Portuguese).

In 2011, he authored a textbook in ecological modeling, Fundamentals of Ecological Modelling, which was published as a fourth edition together with Brian D. Fath of the Department of Biological Sciences, Towson University. It has been translated into Chinese and Russian (third edition). Jørgensen was co-editor in chief of the Encyclopedia of Ecology, published in 2008, and of the Encyclopedia of Environmental Management, published in December 2012. He co-authored the textbook Introduction to Systems Ecology, published in English in 2012 and in Chinese in 2013.

He was an editorial board member of 18 international journals in the fields of ecology and environmental management. He was the president of ISEM, and was elected to the European Academy of Sciences and Arts, for which he was chairman of the Section for Environmental Sciences.

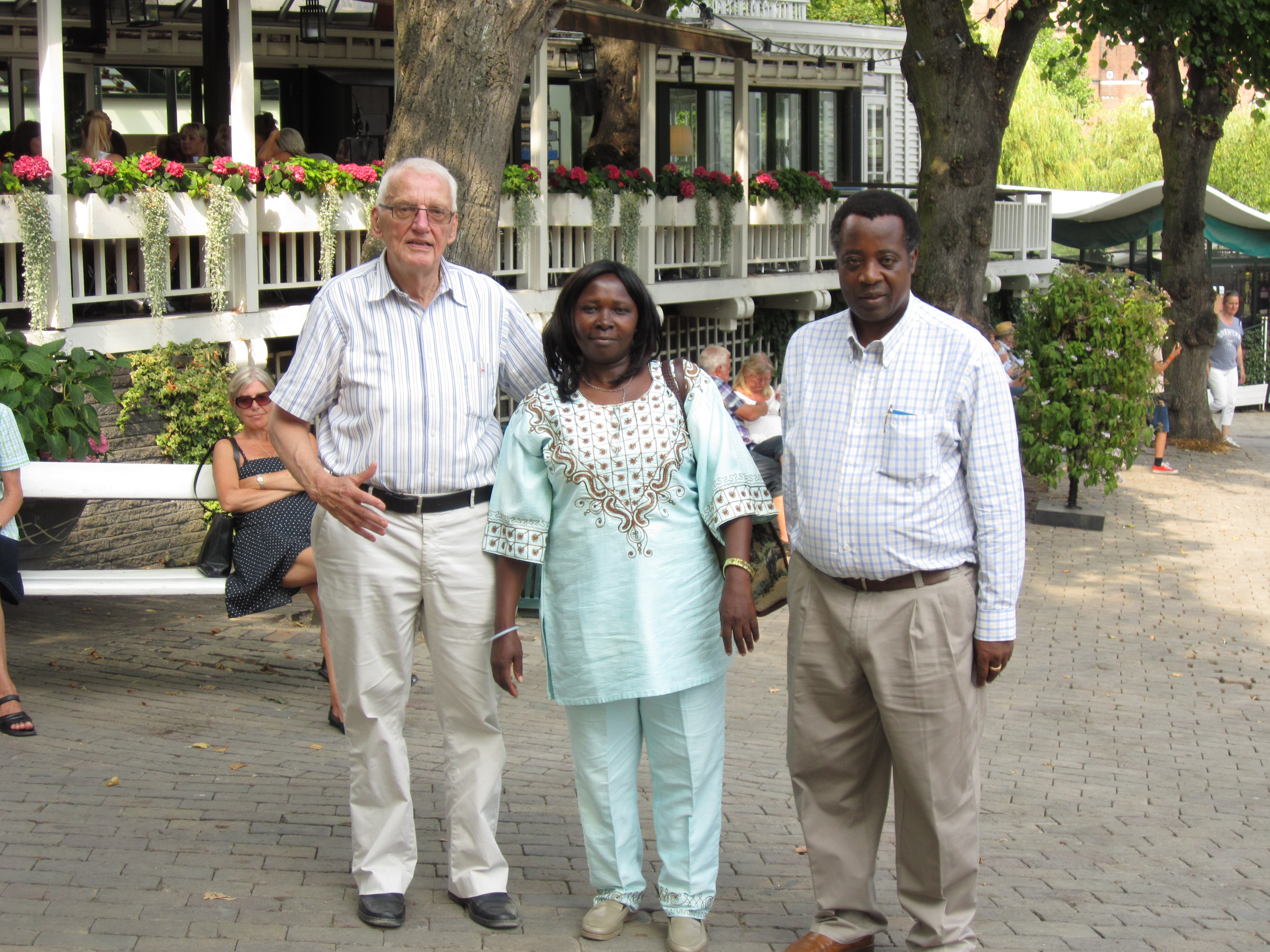
Jorgensen with Dr. Irene Tarimo and Prof. Tolly Mbwette in Denmark

== Personal life ==
He married in 1970 and had one son.

Jørgensen died in 2016 in Copenhagen.

== Awards ==
- Stockholm Water Prize, 2004 for the pioneering development and global dissemination of ecological models of lakes and wetlands, widely applied as effective tools in sustainable water resource management by the University of Copenhagen School of Pharmaceutical Sciences in Denmark
