= H. C. Verma =

Indian nuclear physicist (born 1952)

Harish Chandra Verma
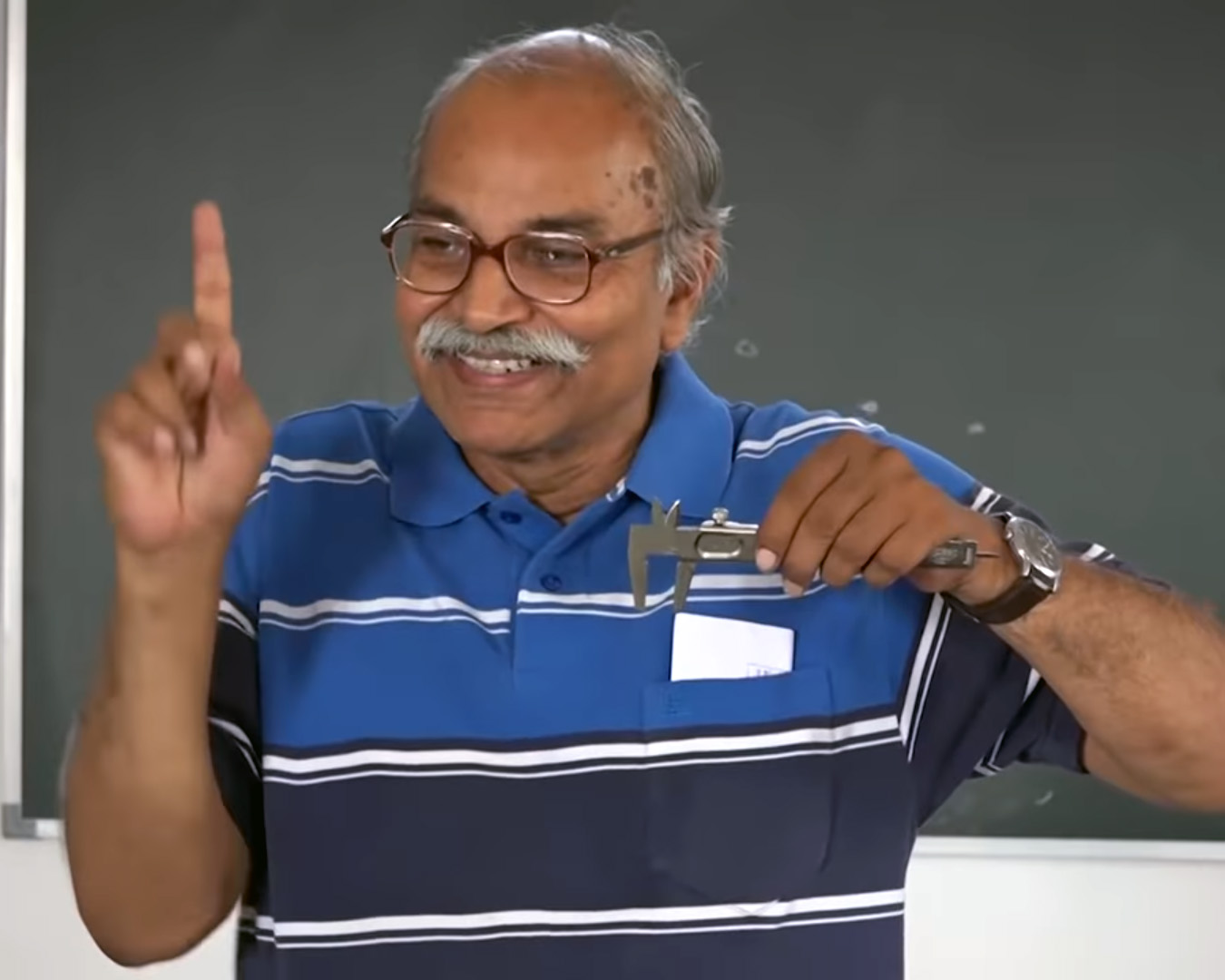
- Indian physicist H C Verma during a lecture in 2019
- Born: 3 April 1952 (age 74); Darbhanga, Bihar, India
- Education: Patna Science College (BSc.) IIT Kanpur (MSc., PhD)
- Known for: Concepts of Physics textbook
- Awards: Maulana Abul Kalam Azad Siksha Puruskar (2017); Padma Shri (2021); IITK Distinguished Alumni Award (2026)
- Scientific career
- Fields: Nuclear physics
- Thesis: Studies Of The Electric Field Gradients in Non-cubic Metals Using 57^Fe Mössbauer Spectroscopy (1980)
- Doctoral advisor: Prof. G. N. Rao (IIT Kharagpur)
- Website: hcverma.in

Harish Chandra Verma (born 3 April 1952), popularly known as HCV, is an Indian experimental physicist, author and emeritus professor of the Indian Institute of Technology Kanpur. He wrote the book "Concepts of Physics." In 2021, he was awarded the Padma Shri, the fourth highest civilian award, by the Government of India for his contribution to Physics Education. His field of research is nuclear physics.

He has authored several school, undergraduate and graduate level textbooks. He has been awarded the Maulana Abul Kalam Azad Shiksha Puruskar by the Bihar state government.

== Early life and study ==
Verma was born on 3 April 1952 to Ganesh Prasad Verma, a teacher and Ramvati Verma in Darbhanga, Bihar. He obtained his Bachelor of Science (B. Sc) degree at Patna Science College. Then he obtained Master of Science (M. Sc) and Doctor of Philosophy (Ph. D) at IIT Kanpur.

== Career ==
=== Patna Science College ===
In early 1980, Verma joined Patna Science College as a lecturer. He remained at the college as a lecturer and reader for 15 years before resigning from the college and joining IIT Kanpur.

=== IIT Kanpur ===
Verma joined IIT Kanpur in 1994 as an assistant professor. Here he pursued research in experimental nuclear physics. He has published 139 research papers. He retired on 30 June 2017.

=== Physics outreach ===
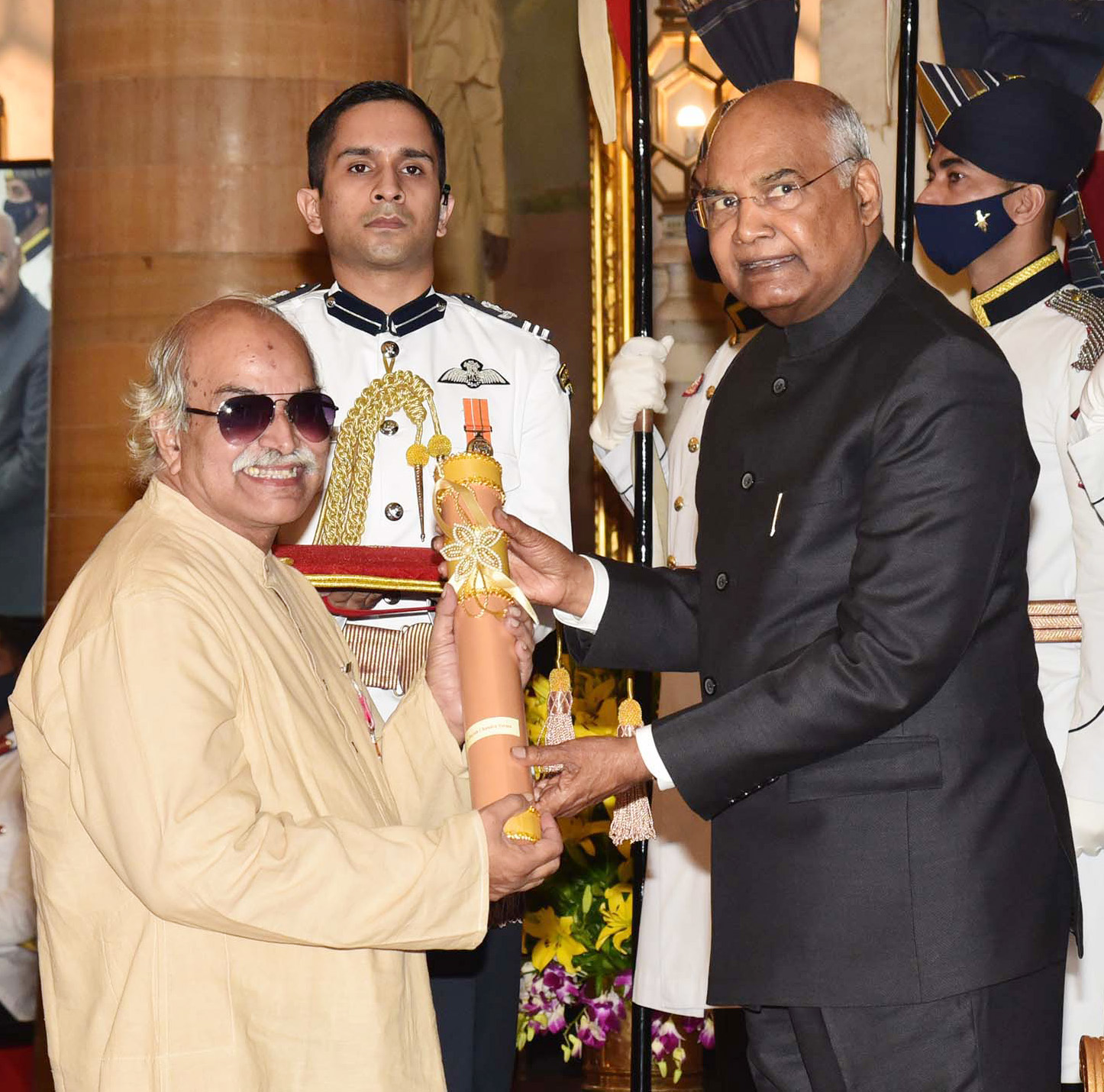
HC Verma receiving Padma Shri from the President of India at Rashtrapati Bhavan

Verma has developed more than six hundred ‘low cost’ physics experiments that teachers can employ in their classrooms. In 2011, he set up the National Anveshika Network of India (NANI), a flagship program of the Indian Association of Physics Teachers (IAPT). He is the national coordinator for this program. There are currently 22 Anveshikas in the country.

== Bibliography ==
- Concepts of Physics Part-1, Bharati Bhawan Publishers & Distributors, 1992, ISBN 8177091875
- Concepts of Physics Part-2, Bharati Bhawan Publishers & Distributors, 1992, ISBN 8177092324
- Quantum Physics, Surya Publication, ISBN 9788192571409
- Foundation Science Physics for class 9, Bharati Bhawan Publishers & Distributors, ISBN 9788177097313
- Foundation Science Physics for class 10, Bharati Bhawan Publishers & Distributors, ISBN 9350270064
- Bhautiki Ki Samajh Part-1, Bharati Bhawan Publishers & Distributors, ISBN 9350271990
- Classical Electromagnetism, Bharati Bhawan Publishers & Distributors, ISBN 978-9388704823

== Awards ==
- Padma Shri (2021)
- Maulana Abul Kalam Azad Shiksha Purashkar (2017)
