= Kanchinath Jha =

Maithili-language writer

Kanchinath Jha "Kiran" (कांचीनाथ झा ‘किरण’ Kāñcīnāth Jhā Kīraṇ; 1906–1989) was an Indian Maithili-language writer. His poetry was representative of the new modernist spirit in Maithili literature after the Second World War. In addition to essays and articles, he wrote novels (like Chandigrahan) which feature realism and treat the problems of common people.

The Kiran Memorial Educational Welfare Society was established in his name.
