= Abhayanand =

Indian Police Service officer

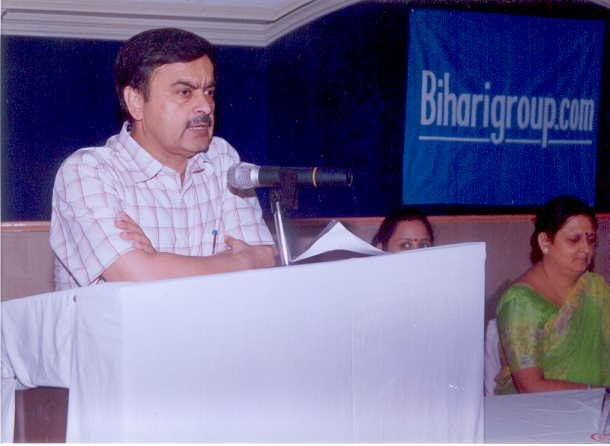
- Speaking as an educationalist in Patna
- Born: Patna, Bihar, India
- Education: Patna Science College
- Occupations: IPS Officer (1977), social activist, educationalist

Abhayanand is an Indian Police Service officer and educationalist who, along with Anand Kumar, conceptualised Super 30 to teach poor students to crack IIT JEE. Following his graduation from Patna Science College, Abhayanand was selected as the IPS officer for the Bihar cadre after clearing UPSC Civil Services Examination in 1977. He was the ADG (headquarters) in 2006 and as such he concentrated on the speedy trial of Arms Act cases in Bihar. Later, during his tenure as the ADG of Bihar Military Police, Patna, he motivated the constables to donate from their salaries to convert a dilapidated government hospital into a modern nursing home with state-of-the-art facilities for treatment of the police force and their family members. Abhayanand was appointed as D.G.P., Bihar in August 2011, following the footsteps of his late father, Mr. Jagatanand Singh who was the 28th D.G.P., Bihar in 1985–86.

== Career ==
=== Director General of Police ===
Abhayanand was appointed as DGP Bihar on 25 August 2011. He took charge as the 48th DGP of the state on 31 August 2011. He served as the DGP of Bihar from 2011 to 2014.

=== Speedy trial ===
Abhayanand is credited with achieving direct criminal convictions in Bihar, India.

=== Special Auxiliary Force ===
To deal with shortage of manpower in the police, Abhayanand came up with the idea of recruiting retired army men. Given that the ex-army men were already trained in arms and combat, there was no ramp up time needed for them. They were ready to contribute from day one. The state government adopted this idea and in few days 5000 ex-army men were recruited by the Bihar state police force. This concept soon became a role model and other states such as Orissa, Madhya Pradesh and Jharkhand started recruiting ex-army men.

=== Rahmani 30 ===
From 2003 to 2008 Abhayanand used to coach the students along with Anand Kumar. However, he split from Kumar in 2007 and then wanted to take his social experiment to a wider forum so that more under-privileged but talented children can benefit out of it. He joined a program called Rahmani 30 headed by Maulana Wali Rahmani where under-privileged Muslim students were selected and then coached for the JEE. In the inaugural year of Rahmani 30, 2009 all of the 10 students part of this program had cleared JEE. In 2010, 4 students out of 12 cracked entrance test. 15 out of 30 Rahmani students cleared the exam in 2011.

=== Other Super 30 ===
Abhayanand provides academic mentorship to students of Magadh Super30, a program run by the people of Gaya on similar lines as Super30. Magadh Super 30 was started in 2008.

=== TEDx Talk ===
He gave a TEDx talk at TEDx Bankipur. He said for him a teacher's definition is, " One who doesn't give the right answer but keeps asking the right questions."

=== Autobiography ===
In August 2022, Abhayanand wrote his autobiography titled Unbounded: My Experiments with Law, Physics, Policing and Super 30.
