= Tathagat Avatar Tulsi =

Indian physicist (born 1987)

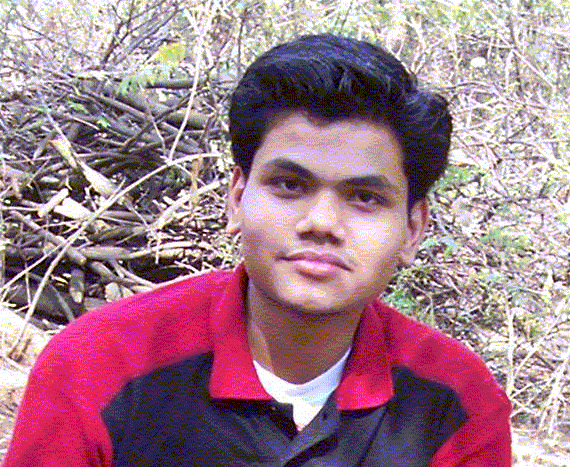
- Tulsi in 2006
- Born: 9 September 1987 (age 38); Patna, Bihar
- Education: Indian Institute of Science; Patna Science College
- Scientific career
- Fields: Physics
- Doctoral advisor: Apoorva D. Patel

Tathagat Avatar Tulsi (born 9 September 1987) is an Indian physicist who is best known as a child prodigy. He completed high school at the age of 9 years, earned a BSc degree at the age of 11 years, and a MSc degree at the age of 12 years from Patna Science College (Patna University). In August 2009, he got PhD from the Indian Institute of Science, Bangalore at the age of 21 years by submitting a thesis of only 33 pages. In July 2010, he was offered a position as assistant professor on contract at IIT Bombay. He became a permanent employee of IIT Bombay in 2012. His one-year probation at IIT Bombay got confirmed in 2013. He took four year long leave from 2014 to 2017 because of his allergic asthma in the hot and humid climate of Mumbai. His employment was terminated in 2019. In August 2021, his appeal against termination was rejected by then-President Ramnath Kovind.

On 30 september 2024, he was selected as an assistant professor at Patliputra University by Bihar State University Service Commission. He is also preparing a Review application to get back his job at IIT Bombay as he has cured his allergic asthma now. He joined Ganga Devi Women's College in Patna as an assistant professor on 28. January 2025.

== Biography ==
Tulsi received wide public attention in 2001, when he was shortlisted by the Indian Government's Department of Science and Technology (DST) to participate in a Nobel laureates conference in Germany.

He was admitted by the Indian Institute of Science (IISc), where his PhD thesis was on "Generalizations of the Quantum Search Algorithm". He co-authored an unpublished research manuscript ("A New Algorithm for Fixed-point Quantum Search") with Lov Grover, the inventor of a quantum search algorithm that goes by his name.

Tulsi was once cheered on as one of the most gifted Asian youngsters by TIME magazine, mentioned as "Superteen" by Science, "Physics Prodigy" by The TIMES, "Master Mind" by The WEEK and listed by Outlook as one of the smartest Indian youngsters. Tathagat Avatar Tulsi participated in the Stock Exchange of Visions project of Fabrica, Benetton's research centre in 2007. He was invited by Luciano Benetton for a dinner in honor of Al Gore on 14 June 2007 in Milano, Italy. Tathagat's story was showcased by National Geographic Channel in the program My Brilliant Brain. The episode named "India's Geniuses" was aired on 13 December 2007 and was hosted by Bollywood actress Konkona Sen Sharma.

== See also ==
- List of child prodigies
