= Sudhanshu Shekhar Jha =

Indian physicist (born 1940)

- Born: 25 December 1940 (age 85) [Vijayanagar, Banka, Bihar 813102], India
- Education: Patna Science College; University of Patna; Stanford University; Harvard University; IBM Research
- Known for: Studies on Optoelectronics
- Awards: 1979 Shanti Swarup Bhatnagar Prize; 1988 C. V. Raman Birth Centenary Medal; 1992 INSA S. N. Bose Medal; 2001–02 ISCA C. V. Raman Birth Centenary Award
- Scientific career
- Fields: Condensed matter physics
- Workplaces: BARC Training School; Tata Institute of Fundamental Research; IIT Bombay; Oklahoma State University
- Doctoral advisor: Felix Bloch; Nicolaas Bloembergen

Sudhanshu Shekhar Jha (born 25 December 1940) is an Indian condensed matter physicist and a former director of Tata Institute of Fundamental Research. Known for his research in optoelectronics, Jha is an elected fellow of all the three major Indian science academies – Indian National Science Academy, National Academy of Sciences, India and Indian Academy of Sciences – as well as of The World Academy of Sciences and American Physical Society. The Council of Scientific and Industrial Research, the apex agency of the Government of India for scientific research, awarded Jha the Shanti Swarup Bhatnagar Prize for Science and Technology, one of the highest Indian science awards, for his contributions to Physical Sciences in 1979. (Note: Long link – please select award year to see details)

== Biography ==
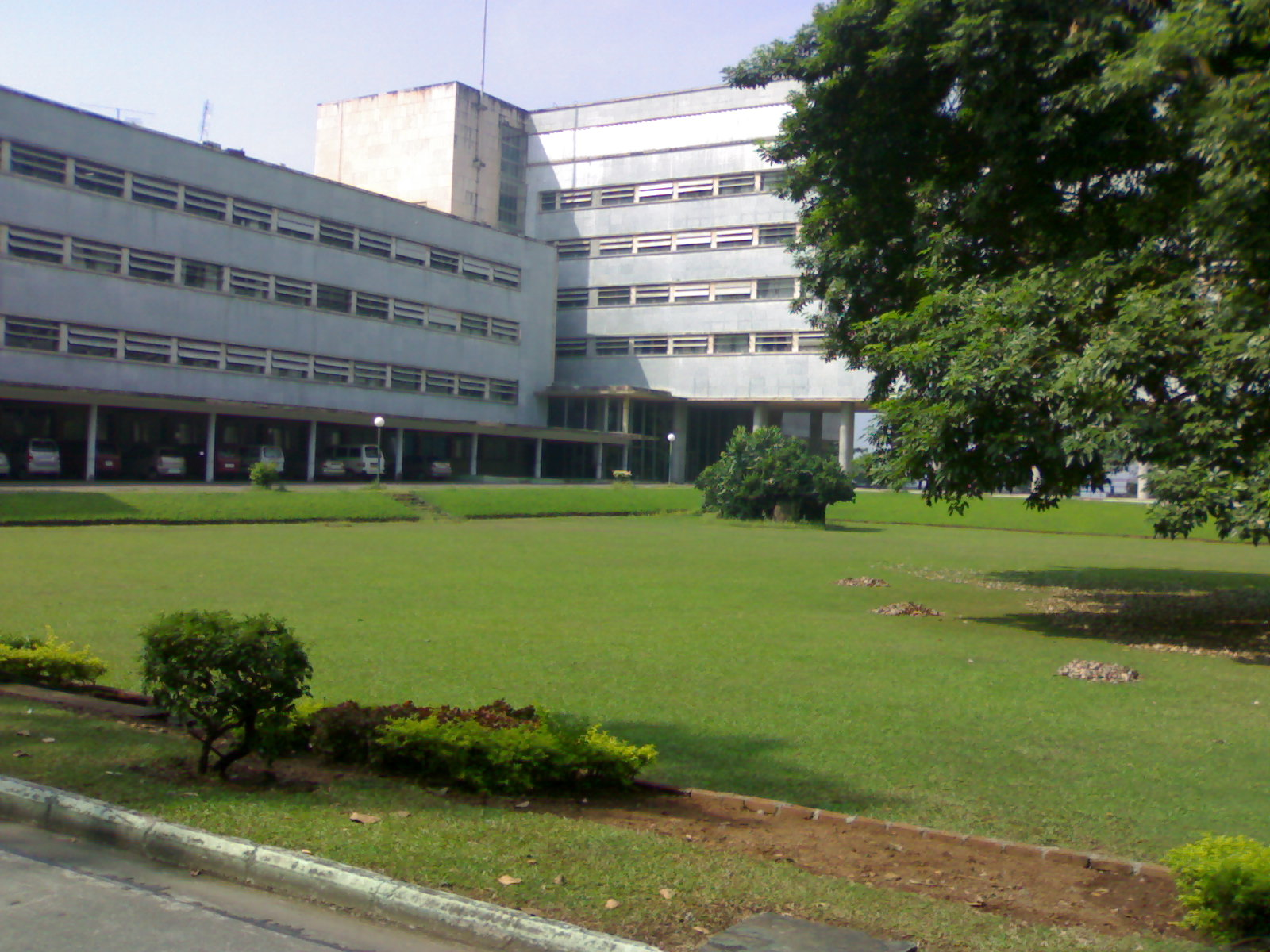
Tata Institute of Fundamental Research

S. S. Jha, born on 25 December 1940 in Banka in the Indian state of Bihar, earned his BSc (hons) from Patna Science College of the University of Patna in 1957 and started his career by joining BARC Training School (then known as Atomic Research Establishment) as a trainee. In 1958, he joined Tata Institute of Fundamental Research (TIFR) as a research assistant but taking a sabbatical from work, he moved to the US to pursue his higher studies. After obtaining an MS in physics and mathematics from Stanford University in 1962, Jha continued there for his doctoral studies, mentored by Felix Bloch, the 1952 Nobel laureate to secure a PhD in 1965. Returning to India, he resumed his career at TIFR as a research fellow and in 1967, he joined Harvard University (Note: On leave from TIFR) to do his post-doctoral work at the laboratory of Nicolaas Bloembergen, who would also go on to win the Nobel Prize in Physics in 1981. Jha spent two years in the US of which the first year was spent at Bloembergen's laboratory (1967–68) and the second at IBM Research Center. He returned to TIFR in 1969 and stayed at the institute till his superannuation in 2002 as the director. During this period, Jha held various positions as a reader, associate professor, professor, senior professor and a distinguished professor. Post-retirement, he worked as a distinguished guest professor at the Indian Institute of Technology, Bombay from 2002 to 2012, and as a guest faculty at Michigan State University and Oklahoma State University. Married to Sudha ( 2 daughters, Nandita and Pallavi).

Jha is associated with Centre for Excellence in Basic Sciences, a collaborative initiative of the University of Mumbai and the Department of Atomic Energy as an honorary professor and lives at Seven Bungalows, in Andheri, a suburb of Mumbai.

== Legacy ==
Raman energy levels

Jha's research was focused on various aspects of solid state and plasma physics, especially non linear optics. He is known to have carried out extensive work on Raman scattering which covered electronic exs in solids, laser beams, superconductivity in layered semimetals, Excitons as well as neutrinos and has investigated the processes occur on a small space within a short time span, using Raman spectroscopy. Jha's work assisted in developing the theory related to wave-wave interactions in a plasma and also contributed in refining thermonuclear fusion studies. His studies have been documented by way of a number of articles (Note: Please see Selected bibliography section) and the article repository of the Indian Academy of Sciences has listed 127 of them. He has also supervised the work of a number of doctoral scholars.

Jha was a member of the scientific advisory committee to the cabinet of the Union Government during 1997–98 and sat in two of the commissions of the International Union of Pure and Applied Physics (IUPAP). He chaired PhD Graduate School Committee of Tata Institute of Fundamental Research from 1969 to 1974, the Board of Research in Nuclear Sciences (BRNS) of the Department of Atomic Energy from 1993 to 1997, the governing council of the Institute of Physics, Bhubaneswar from 2001 to 2007 and the Consortium of the University Grants Commission of India and the Department of Atomic Energy for Scientific Research during the period 2002–08. Jha was a member of the council of the Indian Academy of Sciences from 1989 to 1994 of which he served as the vice president from 1989 to 1991. He was associated with the Indo-French Centre for the Promotion of Advanced Research (IFCPAR) from 1993 to 1996 as a member of its scientific council and has been a member of the governing council of Saha Institute of Nuclear Physics for six years between 1998 and 2004. Jha is a board member of the Institute of Mathematical Sciences, Chennai, and has been associated with the Indian National Science Academy as a council member for the term 1999–2001 and with the Centre for Nano and Soft Matter Sciences (CeNS) as a governing council member.

== Awards and honors ==
The Indian Academy of Sciences elected Jha as their fellow in 1974 and five years later, the Council of Scientific and Industrial Research awarded him the Shanti Swarup Bhatnagar Prize, one of the highest Indian science awards in 1979' the same year as he became a fellow of the Indian National Science Academy. He received the C. V. Raman Birth Centenary Medal in 1988 and the year 1989 brought him the elected fellowships of the American Physical Society and the National Academy of Sciences, India. The Indian National Science Academy honored Jha again with the Satyendranath Bose Bose Medal in 1992. He was elected as a fellow by the Maharashtra Academy of Sciences and a year later, he became a fellow of The World Academy of Sciences. The Indian Science Congress Association selected Jha for the 2001–02 C. V. Raman Birth Centenary Award and the award orations delivered by him include the 1991 Jawaharlal Nehru Birth Centenary lecture of the Indian National Science Academy.

== Selected bibliography ==
- Press, M. R.; Jha, Sudhanshu S. (1992). "Anomalous normal state electronic Raman scattering continuum in YBCO: inadequacy of frequency-dependent collision-rate models". Physica C: Superconductivity. 201 (1–2): 21–26. Bibcode:1992PhyC..201...21P. doi:10.1016/0921-4534(92)90099-X.
- Jha, Sudhanshu S. (1996). "Electronic Raman scattering intensity in layered high-Tc superconductors: threshold energy, symmetry and anisotropy of energy gap". Journal of Raman Spectroscopy. 27 (3–4): 321–327. Bibcode:1996JRSp...27..321J. doi:10.1002/(SICI)1097-4555(199603)27:3/4<321::AID-JRS953>3.3.CO;2-#.
- Jawkar, Swapnil S.; Jha, Sudhanshu S. (2005). "Mean square number fluctuation for a fermion source and its dependence on neutrino mass for the universal cosmic neutrino background". Pramana - Journal of Physics. 64 (1): 17–29. Bibcode:2005Prama..64...17J. doi:10.1007/BF02704526. S2CID 55905199.
- Mahanti, S. D.; Jha, Sudhanshu S. (2006). "The ground state of chargeless fermions with finite magnetic moment". Journal of Physics A: Mathematical and General. 39 (6): 1239–1249. Bibcode:2006JPhA...39.1239M. doi:10.1088/0305-4470/39/6/002. S2CID 120022896.
- Jha, Sudhanshu S.; Mahanti, S. D. (2007). "Hartree-Fock variational bounds for ground state energy of chargeless fermions with finite magnetic moment in the presence of a hard core potential: a stable ferromagnetic state". Pramana - Journal of Physics. 68 (5): 819–830. arXiv:cond-mat/0703547. Bibcode:2007Prama..68..819J. doi:10.1007/s12043-007-0080-y. S2CID 29928369.

== See also ==
- High-temperature superconductivity
- Fermion
- Mean squared displacement
- Hartree–Fock method
