= Ravindra Kumar Sinha (biologist) =

Dolphine Man of India

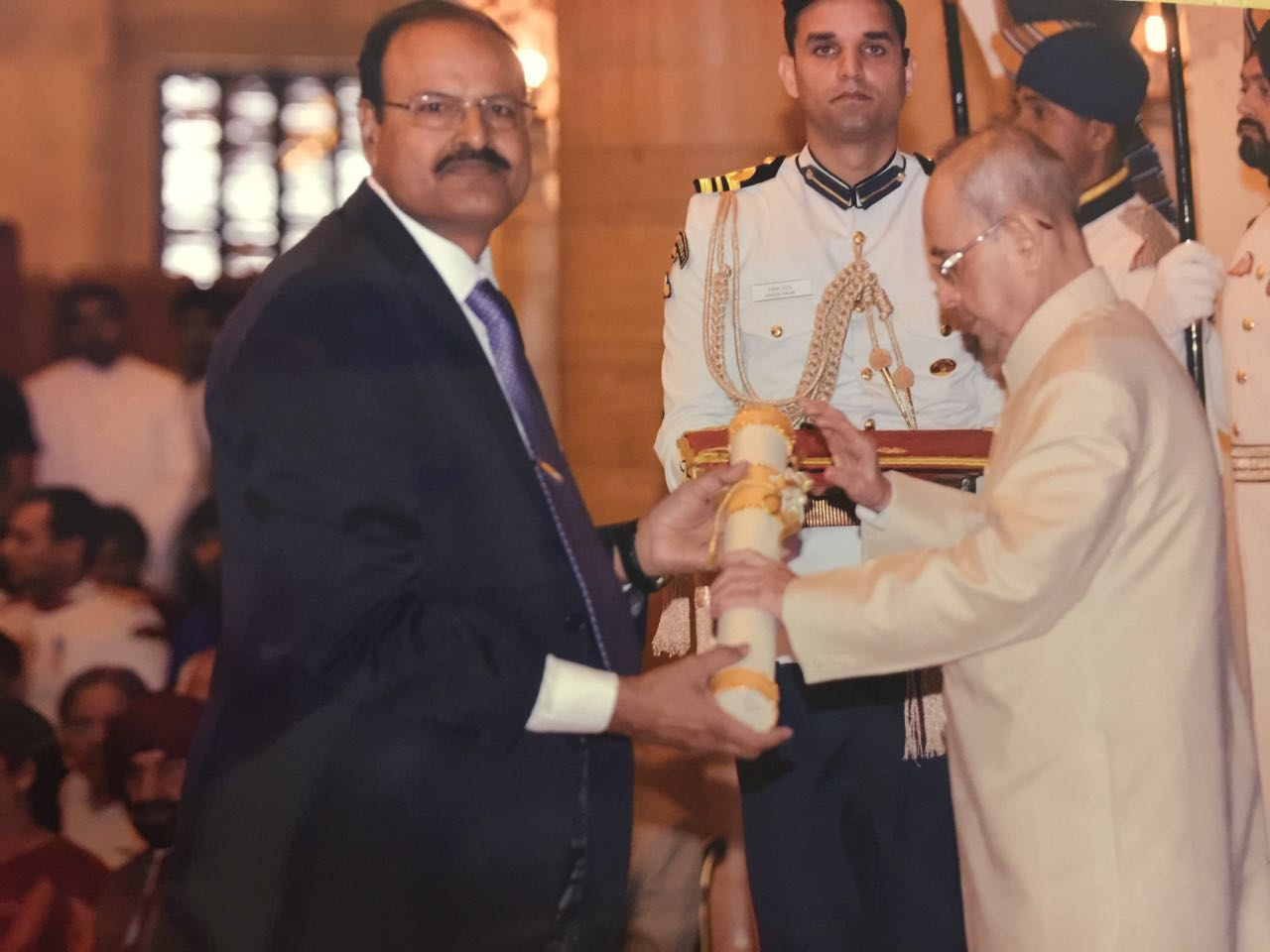
- Ravindra Kumar Sinha receiving Padmashri from President Pranab Mukherjee
- Born: 1954 (age 71–72); Keotar village, Jehanabad dist. Bihar, India
- Other names: Dolphin Man of India; Dolphin Sinha
- Occupations: Served as Vice Chancellor of Shri Mata Vaishno Devi University, Professor, Researcher and Wildlife Conservationist
- Known for: Conservation of Gangetic Dolphins
- Spouse: Uma Sinha
- Parents: Ram Dahin Sinha (father); Gauri Devi (mother)
- Awards: Order of the Golden Ark by His Royal Highness Prince Bernhard of The Netherlands (1999); Golden Jubilee Award of National Academy of Sciences, India (2000); Padma Shri by the President of India (2016); Farsh Se Arsh Tak by Outlook Magazine (2019)

Ravindra Kumar Sinha is a Padma Shri awarded Indian biologist and environmentalist. He served as Vice-Chancellor of Shri Mata Vaishno Devi University from 2019-2023 and also served in Nalanda Open University. Previously he was the Head of the Department of Zoology at Patna University, and is a pioneer researcher and wildlife conservationist, famous for his efforts for the conservation of Gangetic Dolphins, he is popularly known as the "Dolphin Man of India".

His scientific research and conservation campaign for the last 4 decades have been crucial to the efforts of saving the South Asian river dolphin from extinction. In response to the awareness of the urgency of protecting the Ganga River dolphin raised by Sinha, the Government of India designated this Dolphin as the National Aquatic Animal of India in 2009.

== Early life ==
A member of the IUCN Species Survival Commission and the National Ganga River Basin Authority, his contributions are reported in the establishment of the Vikramshila Gangetic Dolphin Sanctuary, Bhagalpur and he is a recipient of the Order of the Golden Ark of the Netherlands. The Government of India awarded him the fourth highest civilian honour of the Padma Shri, in 2016, for his contributions to environmental conservation.

== Work ==
Prof. R K Sinha conducted surveys of the entire length of the Ganges and most of its tributaries in India and Nepal to assess the distribution, population status, ecological requirements, and threats to the dolphin. The animal was facing extinction due to indiscriminate poaching and habitat degradation and loss in many areas. Sinha organized education and awareness programs among the local fishermen as well as secondary and college students. The national and international print and electronic media widely promoted his research and conservation efforts, attracting the attention of both national and international policy makers, executives, and scientific communities.

He was designated as the "Dolphin Man of India" by S.Z. Qasim, Member of the Planning Commission, in the International Seminar on River Dolphins in Delhi in 1992. Sinha was invited to membership of the IUCN (International Union for Conservation of Nature) headquartered in Geneva, Switzerland in 1994; was elected Fellow of the Linnean Society of London in 1996, and elected Chairman of the Asian River Dolphin Committee in 1997 under the aegis of the IUCN.

Sinha has published over 100 research papers in peer-reviewed journals, four books, and over 40 technical and research reports primarily on the Ganges dolphin, river biodiversity, and Ganges pollution. In 2001, he accomplished the first ever rescue and translocation of a stranded pregnant dolphin.

This Gangetic dolphin, which Dr. Sinha is trying to conserve, is one of the only three obligate fresh water dolphins in the world, one of the most endangered mammals on earth; an endemic species of the Indian subcontinent; a natural aquatic heritage of India and an indicator species of the health of the Ganga system. The Gangetic dolphins have long been poached for the extraction of their body oil as a fish attractant for use in oil fishery. Sinha discovered an alternative made from fish scraps. By effectively communicating and popularizing this alternative among Indian fishermen, dolphin poaching has been significantly reduced. This discovery was published in the internationally reputed journal Biological Conservation (London). Sinha developed the Conservation Action Plan for the Gangetic Dolphin in 2010 which was enthusiastically accepted by the Government of India.

Sinha is also known for his contribution to two famous documentaries Alert on the Ganges (26 minutes, French) and Mr. Dolphin Sinha: Think Globally and Act Locally (52 minutes, English) both produced by Mr. Christian Gallissian in 2007.

Sri Jairam Ramesh, Union Minister of Environment and Forests, highlighted Sinha's work in the Rajya Sabha on 8 March 2011 stating, "..one of the leading authorities on dolphin is a Professor. His name is R.K. Sinha, popularly called 'Dolphin Sinha.' With the help of people like him, we are trying to bring back the Gangetic dolphin which is a unique heritage resource for India." Montek Singh Ahluwalia, Deputy Chairman, Planning Commission of India attended dolphin watches in Patna in 2011 and 2012. His enthusiasm for Sinha's conservation efforts led him to establish the National Dolphin Research Center in Patna, now in progress.

== Teaching experience ==
- Patna University
  - Professor of Zoology (since 30 March 1994). Teaching Ecology including Ecosystem Dynamics, Hydro Ecology, Limnology, Water Pollution-causes and control; Air Pollution-causes and control; Population Ecology, Wildlife Conservation, Natural Resources.
  - Associate Professor of Zoology (22 December 1986 to 21 December 1994), Teaching Ecology including Ecosystem Structure and Functions, Water Pollution-causes, effects and control; Air Pollution-causes, effects and control; Wildlife Conservation
  - Assistant Professor of Zoology (17 April 1979 to 21 December 1986). Teaching Ecology including Ecosystem Structure and Functions, Water Pollution-causes, effects and control; Air Pollution-causes, effects and control; Wildlife Conservation
- Central University of Bihar
  - Dean, School of Earth, Biological and Environmental Sciences, 18 April 2011 to 18 July 2012. He was instrumental in appointment of five faculty members for the Centre of Environmental Sciences, four in Centre of Biotechnology and three in Centre of Bioinformatics.
  - Professor of Environmental Science 19 July 2010 to 18 July 2012 (appointed as a Distinguished Professor on invitation)
  - Teaching Ecology and Environmental Science; Hydro Ecology, Hydrological Cycle, Planning for water resource development, Water pollution and control, River and wetlands ecosystems, Biodiversity and Conservation Biology, Restoration Ecology.
- Bhagalpur University
  - Assistant Professor of Zoology (30 March 1978 to 16 April 1979) Teaching Ecology including Ecosystem Structure and Functions, Water Pollution and control, Wildlife Conservation
- Shri Mata Vaishno Devi University • Served as Vice-Chancellor of this Prestigious University of India from 2019-2023. Although his term was recognised by the students as a turbulent one with widespread protests and criticisms against his decisions.

== Administrative experience ==
- In-Charge Vice-Chancellor, Baba Ghulam Shah Badshah University from 29 October 2020 till 13 February 2021.
- Vice-Chancellor, Shri Mata Vaishno Devi University from 6 August 2019 till March 2023
- Vice-Chancellor, Nalanda Open University from 2 May 2017 till 5 August 2019
- Acting Vice-Chancellor, Central University of Bihar on different dates during 2010 - 2012.
- Acting Finance Officer, Central University of Bihar from August 2010 to June 2012.
- Nominated Member of the First Academic Council of Central University of Bihar from August 2009 for 3 years.
- Head, Centre for Environmental Sciences, Central University of Bihar from 19 July 2010 to 18 July 2012.
- Dean, School of Earth, Biological and Environmental Sciences, Central University of Bihar, April 2011 to July 2012.
- Head, Department of Zoology, Patna University, Patna from 24 May 2014 to 1 May 2017.
- Coordinator of the M.Sc. Course in Environmental Science and Management in Patna University, 2007 to 2010.

== Awards ==
- Order of the Golden Ark by His Royal Highness Prince Bernhard of the Netherlands [1999]
- Golden Jubilee award of National Academy of Sciences, India [2000]
- Fourth Highest Civilian Award, Padma Shri by The President of India [2016]
- Farsh Se Arsh Tak by Outlook Magazine [2019]
- ‘Elite Academician Award’ by the Institution of Electrical and Electronic Engineers (IEEE) of the United States of America [2022]

== Research experience ==
- Principal Investigator, Impact of River Front Development Project on the Ganges dolphin in the River Ganges at Patna, funded by the Bihar Urban Infrastructure Development Corporation, Patna, started July 2014 for three years.
- Lead Scientist, in a "Concurrent Monitoring of Persistent Toxic Substances (PTS) in India, China, South Korea, Vietnam and Japan", for two years starting September 2012. It is an International Collaborative Project.
- Chairman, Dolphin Conservation Committee. A Research Project funded by State Government of Bihar for Survey of Gangetic dolphin and their habitats in River Ganga and Gandak, 2012.
- Principal Investigator, Collaborative Research Project with the National Institute of Advanced Industrial Science and Technology (AIST) Tsukuba, Japan to study Pharmaceutical wastes and drug resistant pathogens in sewage and rivers of Ganga system 2012-16.
- Principal Investigator, Collaborative Research Project with the National Bureau of Fish Genetic Resources, Lucknow, ICAR to study Fish Diversity in the lower middle stretch of the Ganges River 2007-09
- Principal Investigator, International collaborative research project on 'Monitoring of movement of Persistent Organic Pollutants through atmosphere with Dr. Tom Harner of 'Environment Canada' during 2005-2007.
- Principal Investigator, NRCD, Min. Env. & Forests, Govt. of India sponsored project for Water Quality Monitoring of River Ganga in Bihar under Ganga Action Plan-II. October, 2003 -ongoing.
- Principal Investigator, Sandia National Laboratory, Department of State and Energy, Govt. of USA sponsored South Asian Trans boundary Water Quality Monitoring Project under SAWAN (South Asian Water Analysis Network), Nov., 2002-Oct., 2005.
- Principal Investigator, NRCD, Ministry of Env. & Forests, Govt. of India sponsored project on "Monitoring of Heavy Metal load in the Ganga at Varanasi" January, 2001- September, 2002.
- Principal Investigator, WWF India sponsored Project on status of Ganges dolphins in the River Sone and Kosi in Bihar. 2001-02.
- Principal Investigator, Department of Wildlife, Ministry of Environment & Forests, Govt. of India sponsored project "Habitat Preference, Population Dynamics, Behaviour, Reproduction, and Ecology of the Ganges River dolphin" April, 2000 – March, the Ganges River dolphin 2000-2007
- Principal Investigator, Whale and Dolphin Conservation Society, UK, sponsored Vikramshila Gangetic Dolphin Sanctuary Project 1998 – 2000.
- Principal Investigator, WWF India sponsored Project on status of Ganges dolphins in rivers of Araria Dist. Bihar. 1998-99
- Principal Investigator, Ganges Biodiversity Research Project under Biodiversity Support Programme. of U.S.A.I.D.- a Consortium of WWF, The Nature Conservancy and World Resources Institute, Washington, U.S.A, 1996-1998.
- Principal Investigator, Ganga Fishery Project, Funded by ODA (UK), through Marine Resources Assessment Group Ltd, Imperial College, University of London, 1993-95.
- Co-Principal Investigator, Water Quality Monitoring Project, sponsored by the Ganga Project Directorate, Govt of India, 1993, ongoing.
- Principal Investigator, Ganges Dolphin Project funded by the Whale and Dolphin Conservation Society, England, 1993-96.
- Principal Investigator, Evaluation and Monitoring Project of Ganga Action Plan and Hazardous Substance Management in Industries; sponsored by the Ministry of Environment and Forests, Govt. of India, 1992-93.
- Principal Investigator, Dolphin Conservation Project, sponsored by the Ganga Project Directorate, Govt. of India 1991-96.
- Principal Investigator, Interdisciplinary Ganga Basin Research Project, sponsored by the Ganga Project Directorate, Ministry of Environment & Forests, Govt. of India, New Delhi, 1985-88.

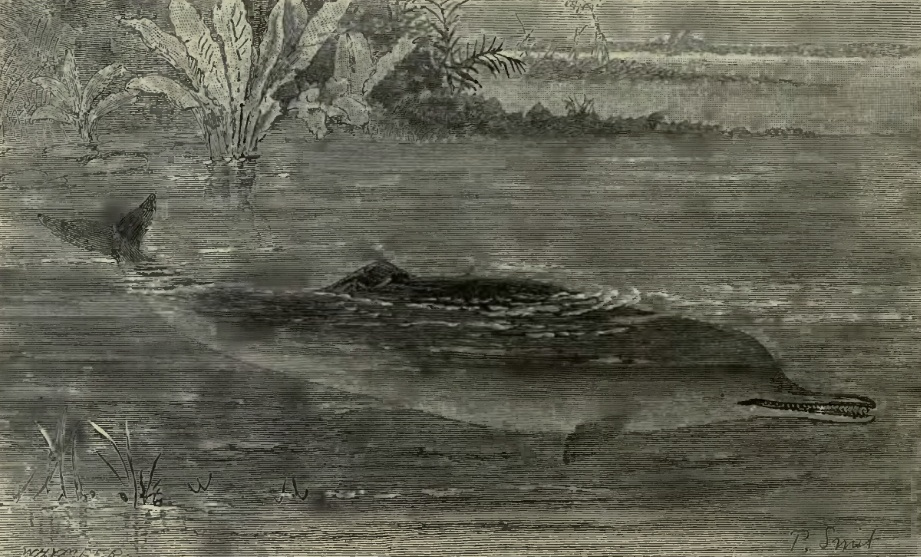
Gangetic dolphin, 1894 book illustration

== See also ==
- South Asian river dolphin
