= Vikas Kumar Jha =

Indian journalist and author

Vikash Kumar Jha
- Born: Shrikhandi Bhittha, Bihar, India
- Occupations: Journalist, writer, author
- Notable work: McCluskieganj: The story of the only Anglo-Indian Village in India

Vikas Jha is an Indian journalist and author. He is best known for his fiction and non-fiction works like McCluskieganj: The story of the only Anglo-Indian Village in India which was awarded with the Katha UK Honour at the House of Commons, London. His other works include Gayasursandhan: The inexplicable story of the inner heart of Gaya and Bodhgaya, Varshavan ki Roopkatha, a novel based on Agumbe village, Bihar: Criminalization of Politics, Satta ke Sutradhar: Azadi ke baad Bharat, Bhog: A novel, and Parichaya Patra: Essays in Bengali.

== Early life ==
Jha was born in village Shrikhandi Bhittha in the Sitamarhi district of Bihar in 1961. He studied M.A. in sociology at Patna University and started his career in journalism in Bihar at the age of 18. His father Shri Laliteshwar Jha was a senior Congress leader and his mother Vimla Jha was a Hindi professor. Jha lives with his wife Rekha in Patna. He constantly travels for work. He has a daughter and a son. His daughter, Srishti is a journalist and writer, and his son, Shubhashish Jha is an actor.

== Career ==
His recent releases include Ullas Ki Naav, a biography of singer and pop icon Usha Uthup in 2019 that was later translated in English by his daughter, journalist and writer Srishti Jha, titled The Queen of Indian Pop with Penguin India.

Jha released his next novel, Raja Momo Aur Peeli Bulbul in 2022 where he looks at Goa, the smallest state of India.

Jha is currently working on two upcoming novels. He is actively associated with the people of Ulihatu, demanding basic rights and proper living conditions for the population. Jha also writes poetry that delves into the human condition, nature, universality and all things relative.

Jha speaks at the literary festivals like the Jaipur Literature Festival, Kolkata Literary Meet, Goa Literature Festival, Kumaon Literary Festival, Ink Talks and Apeejay Kolkata Literary Festival among others.

He has worked with reputed publications like Maya magazine, Ravivaar and Outlook magazine. Jha covered various political, social and cultural issues in a span of 35 years in Hindi Journalism. He has been the editor of Hindi Magazine Rashtriya Prasang.

Jha has anchored a few talk shows for ETV Bihar like Aamne Samne, a talk show with figures from across political, social and cultural platforms, Suno Patliputra, Kya bole Bihar and a multiple news features and talk shows for news channel News Express which he was heading in the year 2013–2014.
