= Bahadurganj, Kishanganj =

Town in Kishanganj, Bihar, India

Bahadurganj Keshav basak
- Bana
- Location in Bihar, India
- Coordinates: 26.27°N 87.82°E
- Country: India
- State: Bihar
- Division: Purnia
- District: Kishanganj
- Elevation: 51 m (167 ft)

Population (2011)
  - Total: 36,993

Languages
  - Official: Hindi, Urdu
  - Native: Surjapuri
- Time zone: UTC+5:30 (IST)
- Lok Sabha constituency: Kishanganj
- Vidhan Sabha constituency: Bahadurganj

Bahadurganj is a town nestled in the Tarai of Himalaya and a notified area in Kishanganj district in the state of Bihar, India.

== Geography ==
Bahadurganj is town at 26.27°N 87.82°E. It has an average elevation of 51 metres (167 feet).

== Demographics ==
=== 2001 Census ===
As of 2001 India census, Bahadurganj had a population of 28,224. Males constitute 53% of the population and females 47%. Bahadurganj has an average literacy rate of 34%, lower than the national average of 59.5%; with 69% of the males and 31% of females literate. 21% of the population is under 6 years of age.

=== 2011 Census ===
As per 2011 census report Bahadurganj has a total population of 36,993 of which 51.02% are males while 48.98% are females. In Bahadurganj Nagar Panchayat, Female Sex Ratio is of 960 against state average of 918. Moreover, the child sex ratio in Bahadurganj is around 1010 compared to Bihar state average of 935. The literacy rate of Bahadurganj city is 61.90% higher than the state average of 61.80%. In Bahadurganj, male literacy is around 68.42% while the female literacy rate is 55.02%. The population of children aged 0–6 is 7019 which is 18.97% of total population of Bahadurganj (NP).

Religions in Bahadurganj
Religion	Percent
Muslims	67.46%
Hindus	31.98%
Others	0.56%
