= Open University of Tanzania =

Online university

The Open University of Tanzania
- Chuo Kikuu Huria Cha Tanzania (Swahili)
- Motto: Affordable Quality Education for all
- Type: Public
- Established: 1992; 34 years ago
- Academic affiliations: AAU, ACU, IAU, St. Mary's University (Addis Ababa), Korea University, Linkoping University, Laweh Open University, Triumphant College, Institute of Judicial Administration Lushoto, Stella Maris Mtwara University College
- Chairman: Prof. Joseph Kuzilwa
- Chancellor: Mizengo Pinda
- Vice-Chancellor: Elifas Bisanda
- Students: c. 70,000
- Undergraduates: 25749
- Postgraduates: 23470
- Other students: 16315
- Location: Dar es Salaam, Tanzania; 6°47′0″S 39°15′52″E
- Campus: Distance learning
- Colors: Blue, yellow, black, white
- Website: www.out.ac.tz

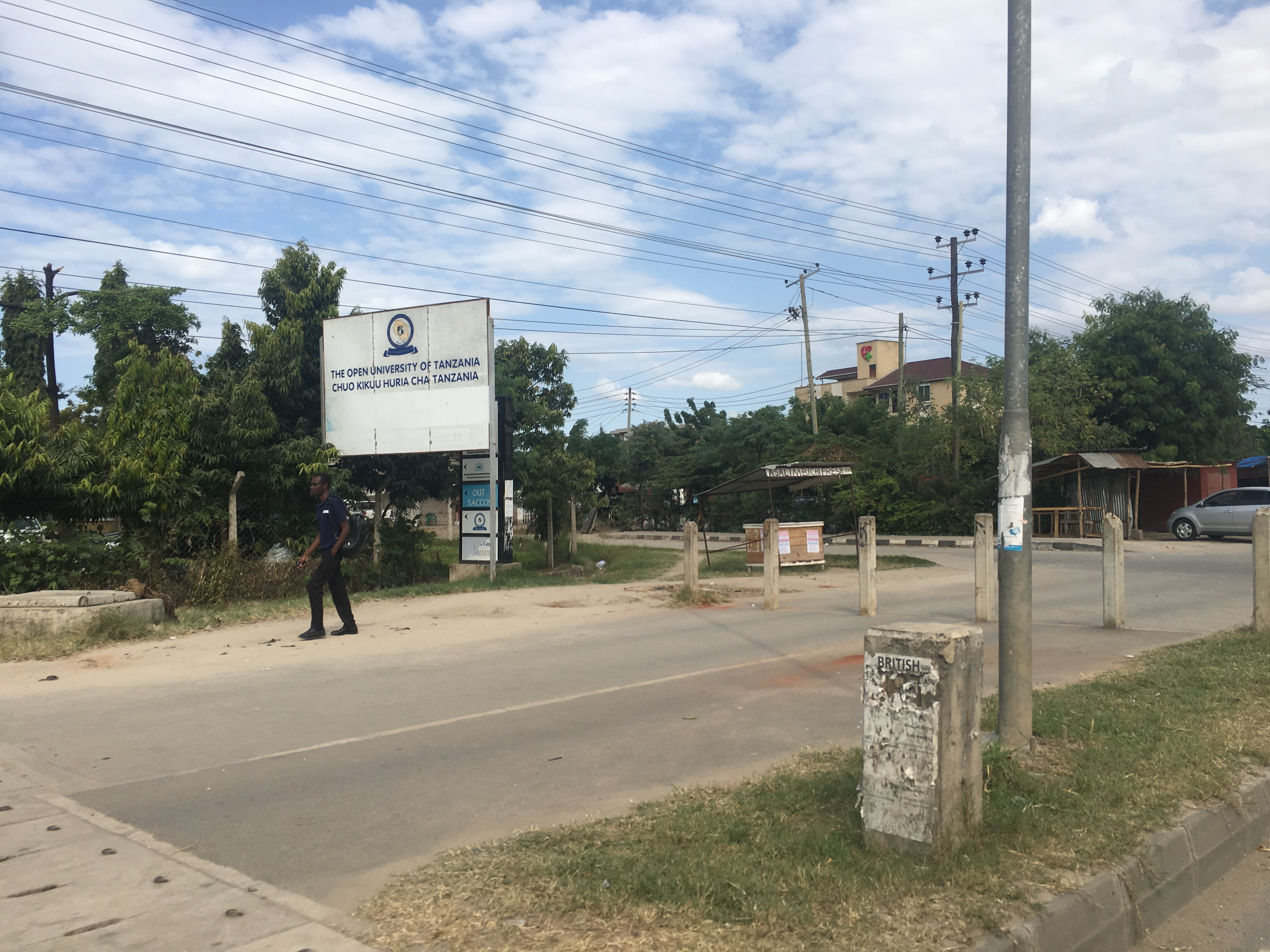
The Open University of Tanzania entrance sign, June 2019.

The Open University of Tanzania (OUT) (Swahili: Chuo Kikuu Huria cha Tanzania) is a distance learning public university in Tanzania and the largest by the number of students. It was established by an Act of Parliament No. 17 of 1992. It is a single mode institution offering certificate, diploma and degree courses through distance learning. Its headquarters is situated in Dar es Salaam, Tanzania, and conducts its operations through 30 Regional Centres and 70 Study Centres. The university has a capacity of approximately 70,000 students both local and international ones.

It consists of:

1. Directorate of Regional Services
2. Directorate of Research and Postgraduate Studies
3. Faculty of Arts and Social Sciences
4. Faculty of Business Management
5. Faculty of Education
6. Faculty of Law
7. Faculty of Science, Technology and Environmental Studies
8. Institute of Educational and Management Technologies
9. Institute of Continuing Education
