= Shanika =

Shanika is a feminine given name. Notable people with the name include:

- Shanika Bruce (born 1995), Barbadian cricketer
- Shanika Karunasekera, Sri Lankan engineer
- Shanika Madumali (born 1990), Sri Lankan rugby sevens player
- Shanika Minor (born 1991), American criminal
- Shanika Roberts-Odle, Barbadian politician
- Shanika Warren-Markland, British actress

== See also ==
- Chanika (disambiguation)
- Shanica
- Shaniqua
