= Majohe =

Ward of Ilala District, Dar es Salaam Region

Majohe Kata ya Majohe (Swahili)
- Ward of Ilala District
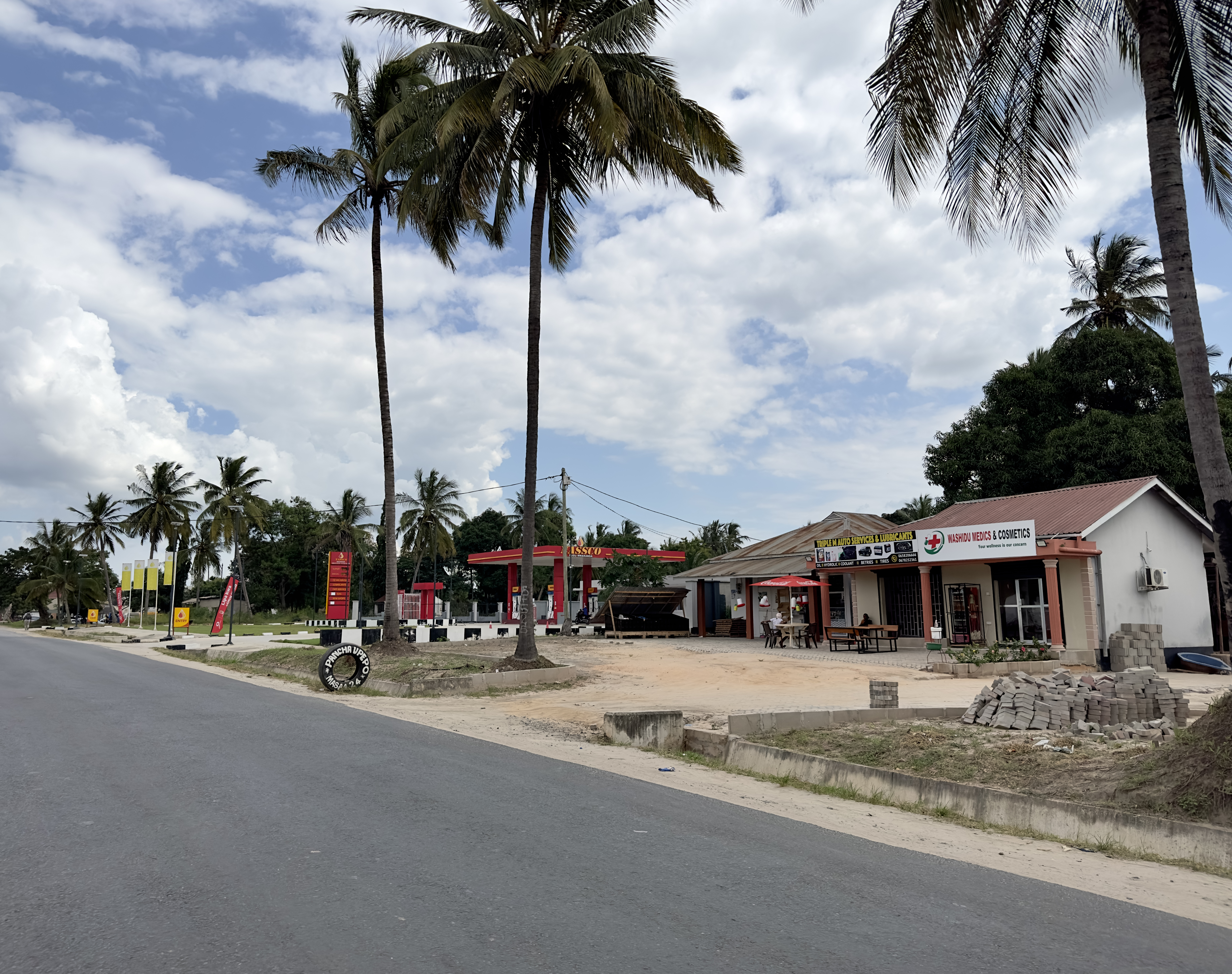
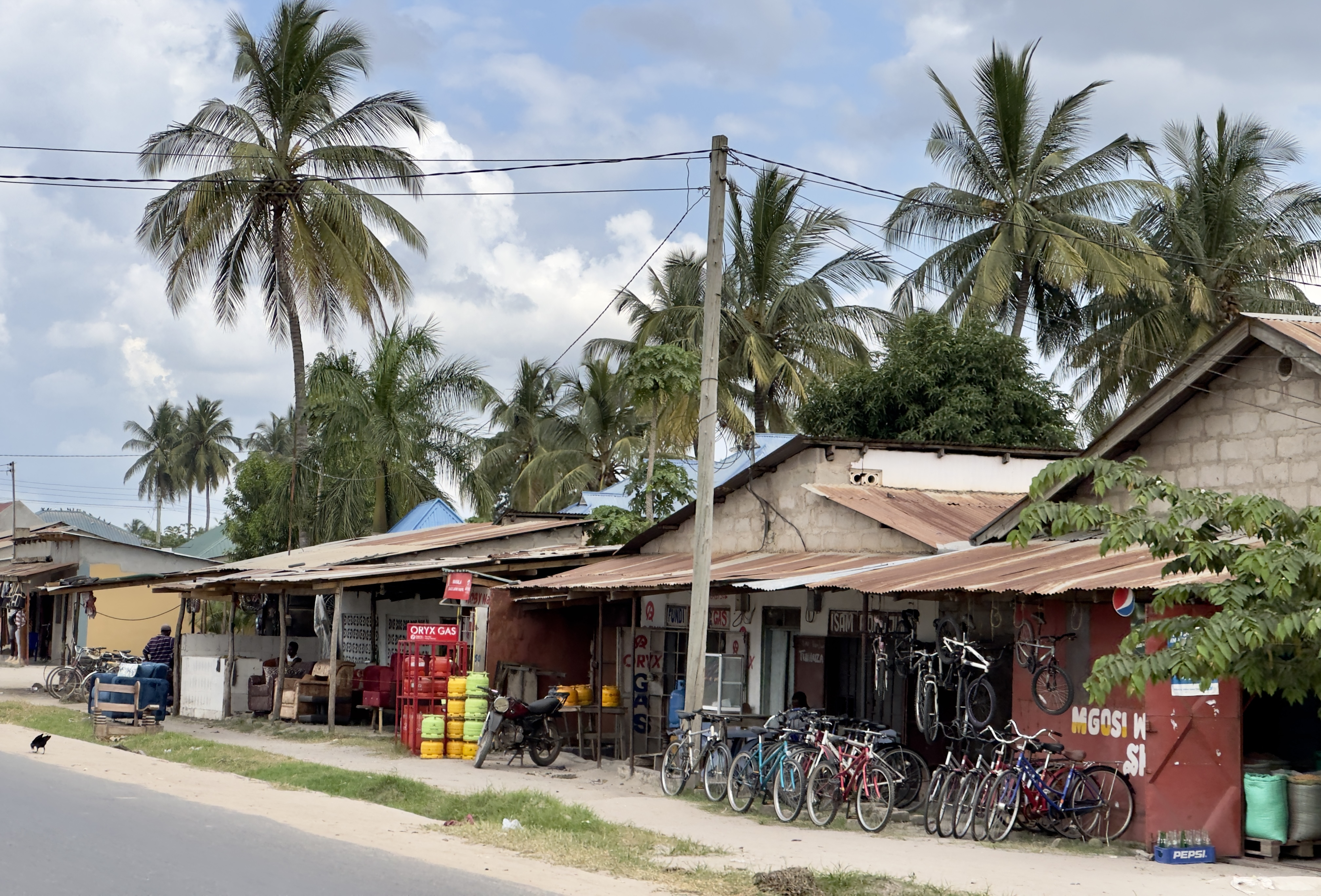
- From top to bottom: Street scene in Majohe ward & bike shop in Majohe ward
- Interactive map of Majohe
- Coordinates: 6°49′37.56″S 39°12′6.48″E
- Country: Tanzania
- Region: Dar es Salaam Region
- District: Ilala District

Area
  - Total: 57.98 km^{2} (22.39 sq mi)

Population (2012)
  - Total: 81,646

Ethnic groups
  - Settler: Swahili
  - Ancestral: Zaramo
- Tanzanian Postal Code: 12113

Majohe (Kata ya Majohe, in Swahili) is an administrative ward of the Ilala Municipical Council of the Dar es Salaam Region in Tanzania. The communities of Ukonga, Gongolamboto, and Pugu border the ward on the north. By Kisarawe Ward in Kisarawe District in Pwani Region, to the west. Chanika and Msongola form the southern boundary of the ward. Kivule borders the ward on its eastern side. According to the 2012 census, the ward has a total population of 81,646.

== Administration ==
The postal code for the Majohe ward is 12113. The ward is divided into the following neighborhoods (Mitaa):

- Kichangani, Majohe
- Kivule, Majohe
- Mjimpya, Majohe

- Rada
- Viwege

=== Government ===
The ward, like every other ward in the country, has local government offices based on the population served.The Majohe Ward administration building houses a court as per the Ward Tribunal Act of 1988, including other vital departments for the administration the ward. The ward has the following administration offices:

- Majohe Police Station
- Majohe Government Office (Afisa Mtendaji)
- Majohe Ward Tribunal (Baraza La Kata) is a Department inside Ward Government Office

In the local government system of Tanzania, the ward is the smallest democratic unit. Each ward is composed of a committee of eight elected council members which include a chairperson, one salaried officer (with no voting rights), and an executive officer. One-third of seats are reserved for women councillors.

== Demographics ==
The ward serves as the Zaramo people's ancestral home, along with much of the district. As the city developed throughout time, the ward became into a cosmopolitan ward. In total, 81,646 people called the ward home in 2012.

== Education and health ==
=== Education ===
The ward is home to these educational institutions

- West Dar es Salaam Primary School
- Egalitarian Primary School
- Holy Family Primary School
- Ursuline Primary School
- Zavala Primary School
- Daora Secondary School
- Golden Secondary School, Majohe
- Taifa Academy international School

=== Healthcare ===
The ward is home to the following health institutions:

- Hebab Health Center
- Tikaya Health Center
- West Dar es Salaam Hospital, Majohe.
