= Chanika =

Chanika may refer to:

- Emmie Chanika (1956–2022), a Malawian human rights activist
- Chanika, Handeni, an administrative ward in Tanzania
- Chanika, Ilala, an administrative ward in Tanzania

== See also ==
- Shanica
- Shanika
- Shaniqua
