= African-American names =

African-American names are an integral part of African-American tradition. While many Black Americans use names that are popular with wider American culture, several specific naming trends have emerged within African-American culture.

== History ==
During the period of chattel slavery in the United States, enslaved Black people remained legally nameless from the time of their capture until American slavers purchased them. A separate Black American naming culture was imposed by early White slavers who renamed their slaves with biblical, classical Greek and Roman, and mythological names that both showed off the slave owner's erudition and were not commonly used for Whites. Examples from pre-1808 slave roles include Chloe, Ceaser [sic], Homer, Philbe, Polidore, Scipio, and Venus.

The Book of Negroes, originally published in New York in 1783, shows that the most common Black names in Colonial America, among both free and enslaved people, included these classical choices along with place-names such as London, Dublin, and Boston. Nicknames were commonly used as proper names, given to more than a third of Black females at the time. These nickname-names included Sukey, Sally, Betsy, Jenny, Sam, Jack, Jim, and Billy.

Economic historians Lisa D. Cook, John Parman and Trevon Logan have found that distinctive African-American naming practices happened as early as in the Antebellum South (mid-1800s). However, those early names are no longer used.

Paustian has argued that Black names display the same themes and patterns as those in West Africa. With the rise of the 1960s civil rights movement and the wider counterculture of the 1960s, there was a dramatic rise in African-American names of various origins. In 2004, Fryer and Levitt examined the rapid change in naming practices in the early 1970s, with the rapid adoption of distinctively black names, especially in low-income, racially isolated neighborhoods. They favored an explanatory model that attributes a change in Black perceptions of their identity to the Black power movement.

The most common and typical names among enslaved women in America included Bet, Mary, Jane, Hanna, Betty, Sarah, Phillis, Nan, Peg, and Sary. Private names were Abah, Bilah, Comba, Dibb, Juba, Kauchee, Mima, and Sena. Those enslaved in French Louisiana received names differing from English colonies in America: François, Jean, and Pierre for men; and Manon, Delphine, Marie Louise, Celeste, and Eugenie for women. Spanish colonies in America had Spanish names as Francisco, Pedro, and Antonio for enslaved men; and for enslaved women, the names were Maria, Isabella, and Juana.

== Influences and conventions ==
Lieberson and Mikelson of Harvard University analyzed Black names, finding that the recent innovative naming practices follow American linguistic conventions even if they are independent of organizations or institutions. Given names used by African-American people are often invented or creatively-spelled variants of more traditional names. Some names are created using syllables; for example, the prefixes La- or De- and the suffixes -ique or -isha. Also, punctuation marks such as apostrophes and dashes are sometimes used, though infrequent.

=== French names ===
While creoles of color historically had classical French names, many names of French origin entered the picture during the 1950s and 1960s in homage to the relative freedom that many African American expatriates in Paris had experienced during and after the Années folles. Opinions on the origins of the French influence vary, but historically French names such as Monique, Chantal, André, and Antoine became so common within African-American culture that many Americans began to think of them solely as "Black names". These names are often seen with spelling variations such as Antwan, Antwaun or Antwon (Antoine) or Shauntelle (Chantal).

=== Afrocentric and inventive names ===
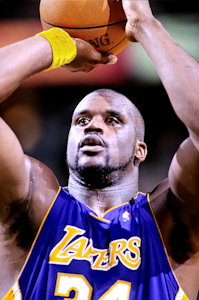
Basketball player Shaquille O'Neal. Shaquille, shortened to "Shaq", is an example of an invented African-American spelling of the name Shakil.

The Afrocentrism movement that grew in popularity during the 1970s saw the advent of African names among African-Americans, as well as names imagined to be "African-sounding". Names such as Ashanti have African origins. The Black Power movement inspired many to show pride in their heritage. Harvard University sociologist Stanley Lieberson noted that, in 1977, the name "Kizzy" rose dramatically in popularity following use of the name in the book and television series Roots.

By the 1970s and 1980s, it had become common within African-American culture to invent new names using elements from already popular names. Prefixes such as La/Le, Da/De, Ra/Re, or Ja/Je and suffixes such as -ique/iqua, -isha (for girls), -ari and -aun/awn (for boys) are common, as well as inventive spellings for common names. The book Baby Names Now: From Classic to Cool—The Very Last Word on First Names places the origins of "La" names in African-American culture in New Orleans.

Apostrophes are seen more often within African-American names than other American names, such as the names Mo'nique and D'Andre.

In his dictionary of Black names, Cenoura asserts that in the early 21st century, Black names are "unique names that come from combinations of two or more names, names constructed with common prefixes and suffixes...'conjugated' with a formula..." "Da", "La", and related sounds may originate from the French spoken in Louisiana. Attached to a common name such as Seán and spelled phonetically, one obtains "DaShawn". Diminutive suffixes from French, Spanish, and Scottish, such as "ita", may be combined directly with prefixes or to a name, as is often found in other naming or nicknaming. Conventions followed usually make the person's gender easily identifiable. Following Spanish, masculine names frequently end in "o" (e.g., "Carmello") while feminine names end with "a" (e.g., "Jeretta"). Following Irish and Italian, apostrophes may be used (e.g., "D'Andre" and "Rene'e"). Parents' names may be blended (e.g., the son of "Raymond" and "Yvonne" might be named "Rayvon").

Rather uncommonly or unconventionally, some non-African-Americans have been given names usually perceived as typically carried by their Black fellows. An example of a European-American with an explicitly Afrocentric name is Miss Michigan USA 2014 winner and Miss USA 2015 delegate, Rashontae Wawrzyniak.

=== Muslim names ===
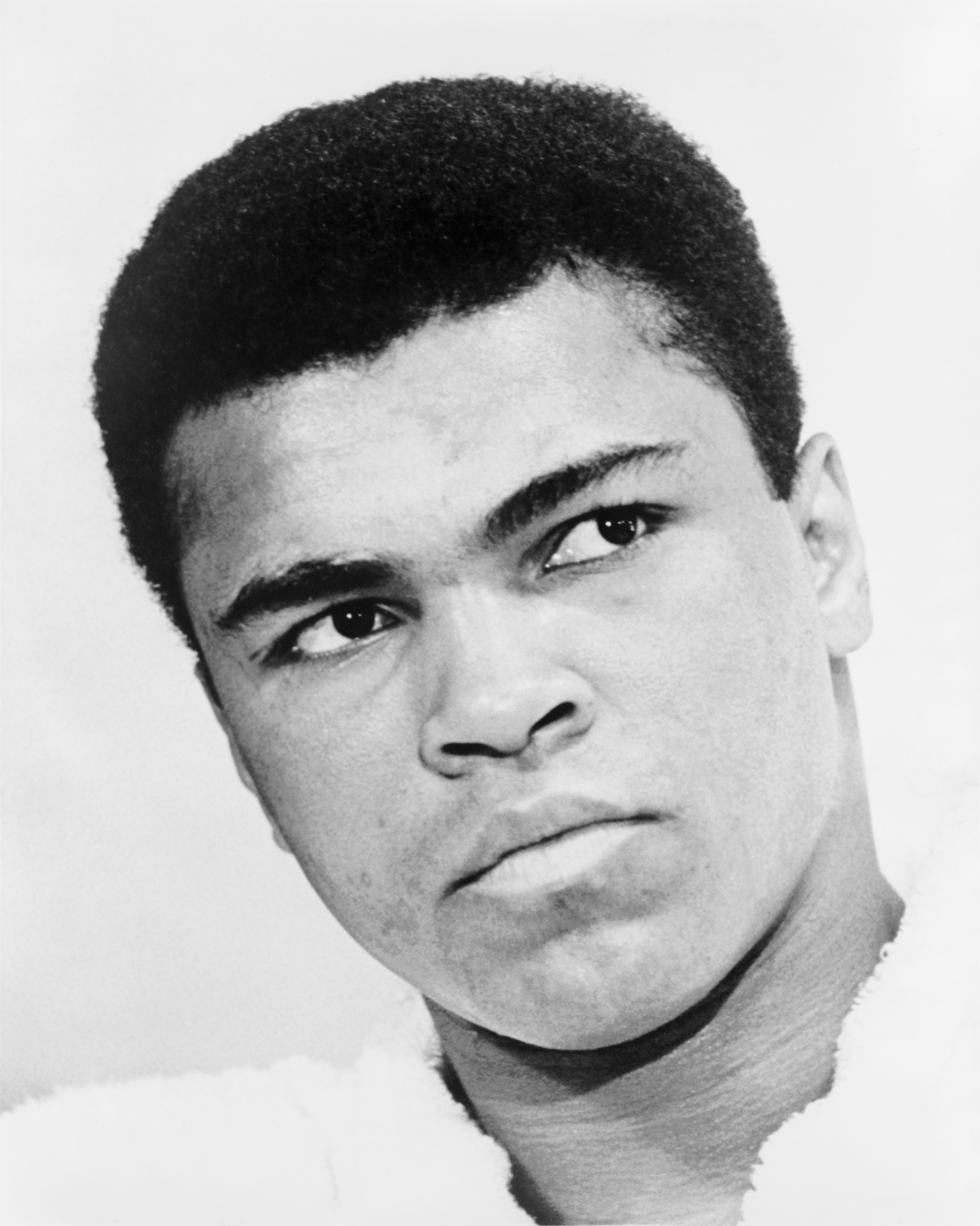
Muhammad Ali's name change from Cassius Clay in 1964 helped inspire the popularity of Muslim names within African-American culture.

Islam has been an influence on African-American names. Islamic names entered African-American culture with the rise of the Nation of Islam among Black Americans with its focus upon Black supremacy and separatism. The popular names Aisha, Aaliyah, and others are also examples of names derived from Islam.

Several African-American celebrities began adopting Muslim names (frequently following a religious conversion to Islam), including Muhammad Ali, who changed his name in 1964 from Cassius Marcellus Clay, Jr. Other celebrities adopting Muslim names include Kareem Abdul-Jabbar (formerly Lew Alcindor) and Amiri Baraka (formerly LeRoi Jones). Despite the Muslim origin of these names and the place of the Nation of Islam in the Civil Rights Movement, many Muslim names, such as Jamal and Malik, entered popular usage among Black Americans simply because they were fashionable, and many Islamic names are now commonly used by African Americans regardless of religion. Also, there have been a few non-Black, non-Muslim Americans who bear those names.

=== Ethnic African words and names ===
Some Black Americans gave and still give their children ethnic African names or names derived from African concepts. Some celebrities like Nas, named Olu Dara, have a name from Yoruba, a West African language. Singer Ashanti was named after the Ashanti Empire and the people in modern Ghana.

Some Black Americans also changed their birth names to those which they felt matched their African identity, like Ntozake Shange. Born Paulette Williams, Shange asked South African musicians Ndikho and Nomusa Xaba to give her African names and she was given "Ntozake Shange" from the Zulu and Xhosa languages. Shange's sister Wanda also changed her name to Ifa Bayeza later in life, with Ifa being a Yoruba word and concept. Actor Donald Cohen changed his name to Obba Babatundé, with Oba meaning "king" in Yoruba, spelled with two Bs in his name; and Babatunde, a Yoruba word meaning "Father has returned", signifying a belief in reincarnation and honoring a deceased father or male ancestor of the parents.

In 1968, Alice Williams, at 21, changed her name to Afeni Shakur; Afeni is Yoruba for "lover of people". These names were based on pride in African ancestry, not necessarily individual claims of being from the particular ethnic groups the names were taken from. Black Americans are mixed with several African ethnicities; the naming conventions were out of inspirational or popular or well-known African ethnic groups they could get information about or felt connected to. Also, Sade or Shade, also spelled Sharday or Shardae in the West, is an African name that has grown in use among Black Americans, popularized by the singer Sade Adu.

=== European and biblical names ===
Even with the rise of created names, it is still common for African Americans to use biblical or European names. Daniel, Christopher, Michael, David, James, Joseph, and Matthew were among the most common names for African-American boys in 2013.

== Workplace discrimination ==
In recent years, some evidence points to workplace discrimination based on names. A study in the early 2020s concluded that applicants with traditionally black names have 2.1% less chance of getting a callback after a job interview. Studies by the University of Chicago and the University of California, Berkeley, in which over 83,000 entry-level job applications were submitted, showed that 7% of all jobs in the experiment were biased against traditionally black names. The research asserted candidates with black names were less likely to have a callback and eventual employment.

== See also ==
- Shaniqua
- Arabic name
- Stereotypes of African Americans
- "Substitute Teacher" (Key & Peele)
