= Mouhammad Mpezamihigo =

Ugandan university administrator

- Born: 23 July 1968 (age 58); Uganda
- Citizenship: Uganda
- Education: Kigezi High School, Makerere University, University of Reading
- Occupations: Agriculturalist, Academic, University administrator
- Years active: 1994 – present
- Known for: Academic leadership
- Title: Vice Chancellor; Equator University of Science and Technology

Mouhammad Mpezamihigo born (23 July 1954) is a Ugandan Agriculturalist, Chair of Senate and the current Vice Chancellor of Equator University of Science and Technology in Uganda.

== Education ==
He attended Kigezi High School for both his O-Level and A-Level. Mpezamihigo obtained his Bachelor of Science in Forestry and Master of Science in Agriculture, both from Makerere University and Kampala Uganda. He holds a Ph.D. in Horticulture and Landscape from the University of Reading in the United Kingdom.

== Career ==
Prof Mouhammad Mpezamihigo is the current Vice Chancellor of Equator University of Science and Technology, Masaka Uganda East Africa. At the time of his appointment, Mpezamihigo had served as the Vice Chancellor Kampala International University for 9 years (2015-2024). He was also previous Vice Rector at the Islamic University in Uganda from 2005 to 2015.

He is also Vice chairperson at Kampala International University in Tanzania.

== Awards and recognition ==
In 2015, Prof Mpezamihigo received the Education Leadership Award under the World Education Congress Global Awards in Mumbai, India. He has also received a recognition award from the Uganda National Council of Education (NCHE) for the period 2007–2017.

== Publications ==
Haruna Kigongo and M. Mpezamihigo (2013). Factors Affecting Agro-Marketing in Budaka District, ISBN 9783659431685 LAP Lambert Academic Publishing; Paper back 80 Pages.

Aisha Namukwaya and M. Mpezamihigo (2013). Exploring Electronic Learning for Distance Education in Uganda, ISBN 9783659407505 LAP Lambert Academic Publishing; Paper back 56 Pages.

Selected Articles

Van Reisen, M., Amare, S.Y., Nalugala, R., Taye, G.T., Gebreselassie, T.G., Medhanyie, A.A., Schultes, E. & Mpezamihigo, M. (2023). Federated FAIR principles: Ownership, localisation and regulatory compliance (OLR). In: FAIR Connect, 1(1), 1-7. IOS Press. DOI: https://doi.org/10.3233/FC-230506

Van Reisen, M., Oladipo, F., Mpezamihigo, M., Plug, R., Basajja, M., Aktau, A., Purnama Jati, P.H., Nalugala, R., Folorunso, S., Amare, Y.S., Abdulahi, I., Afolabi, O.O., Mwesigwa, E., Taye, G.T., Kawu, A., Ghardallou, M., Liang, Y., Osigwe, O., Medhanyie, A.A., Mawere, M.: Incomplete COVID-19 data: The curation of medical health data by the Virus Outbreak Data Network-Africa. Data Intelligence 4(4) (2022). doi: 10.1162/dint_e_00166

Van Reisen, M., Amare, S.Y., Nalugala, R., Taye, G.T., Gebreselassie, T.G., Medhanyie, A.A., Schultes, E. & Mpezamihigo, M. (2023). Federated FAIR principles: Ownership, localisation and regulatory compliance (OLR). In: FAIR Connect, 1(1), 1-7. IOS Press. DOI: https://doi.org/10.3233/FC-230506

Van Reisen, M., Oladipo, F., Stokmans, M., Mpezamihigo, M., Folorunso, S., Schultes, E., Basajja, M., Aktau, A., Yohannes Amare, S., Tadele Taye, G., Hadi Purnama Jati, P., Chindoza, K., Wirtz, M., Ghardallou, M., van Stam, G., Ayele, W., Nalugala, R., Abdullahi, I., Osigwe, O., Graybeal, J., Abrha Medhanyie, A., Abubakar Kawu, A., Liu, F., Wolstencroft, K., Flikkenschild, E., Lin, Y., Stocker, J., Musen, M.A. (2021). Design of a FAIR digital data health infrastructure in Africa for COVID-19 reporting and research. In: Advanced Genetics, Volume 2, Issue 2. https://doi.org/10.1002/ggn2.10050

Basajja, M., Suchanek, M., Taye, F.O., Van Reisen, M. & Mpezamihigo, M. (2022) Proof of concept and horizons on deployment of FAIR Data Points in the COVID-19 pandemic. Data Intelligence 4(4) (2022). doi: 10.1162/dint_a_00179

Mpezamihigo, M. (2022) Critical Issues for AU-EU Collaboration on Health and Science Speaking Notes Prof Dr Mouhamed Mpezamihigo Vice Chancellor Kampala International University (KIU) At the occasion of the AU-EU Summit 17 February 2022https://raee.eu/wp-content/uploads/2022/02/Prof-Mouhamad-

Mpezamihigo-VC-KIU-Reverse-Linkages-17-February-2022-.pdf

Mpezamihigo, M. (2017). Ten years of milestones and unfinished business of the Uganda National Council for Higher Education (NCHE): A view from outside the Secretariat: In The National Council for Higher Education (NCHE) and the growth of the university sub-sector in Uganda, 2002 to 2012 by A.B.K. Kasozi with a Chapter by Mouhamad Mpezamihigo

Mpezamihigo M: Challenges of maintaining quality education in private universities in Uganda: A case study of the Islamic University in Uganda. Paper presented 18th Conference of Commonwealth Education Ministers Mauritius, August 28–31. 2012.

Mpezamihigo, M. (2011). A critical Analysis of Environmental Management derived from the Holy Quran: In International Symposium on Quran and Contemporary Issues conference proceedings 4–5 June 2011, Nairobi, pp 260–270

FAIR and GDPR Compliant Population Health Data Generation, Processing and Analytics Conference: 13th International Conference on Semantic Web Applications and Tools for Health Care and Life Sciences t: Leiden, Netherlands (January 2022)

Mpezamihigo, M. and Wardah R. G (2014). Research, Publications and Innovations, in up coming African Universities, a paper presented to the International Network of Research Management Societies (INORMS), 2014. Washington DC, April, 2014

Mpezamihigo, M. (2014). Management and Leadership Development of Managers of Ugandan Universities- the Carnegie Journey in University Management and Leadership Magazine, National Council for Higher Educations, 1st Edition pp 27–29

Mpezamihigo, M. (2014). Towards strengthening Muslim Education Institutions, a keynote address to a Regional Education Conference on Muslim Education organized by Uganda Muslim Teachers Association (UMTA), 4–7 July 2014.

Mpezamihigo, M. (2007), The Journey in and out of the University, Islamic University Student Union Publication, February 2007

== Other considerations ==
Mpezamihigo serves on the Islamic University in Uganda main scholarship committee and on the Alimiyya Sajjabi Foundation Scholarship Board.
