= Gongolamboto =

Ward of Ilala District, Dar es Salaam Region

Gongolamboto Kata ya Gongolamboto (Swahili)
- Ward of Ilala District
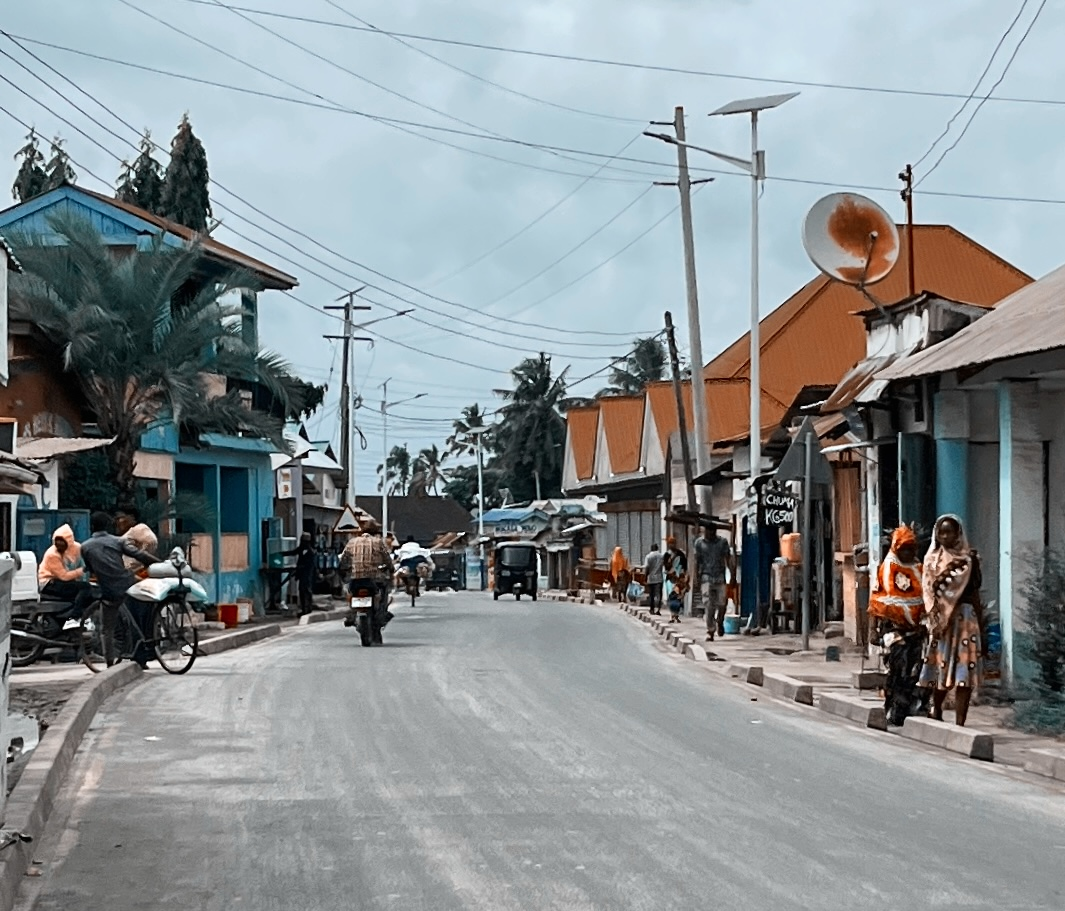
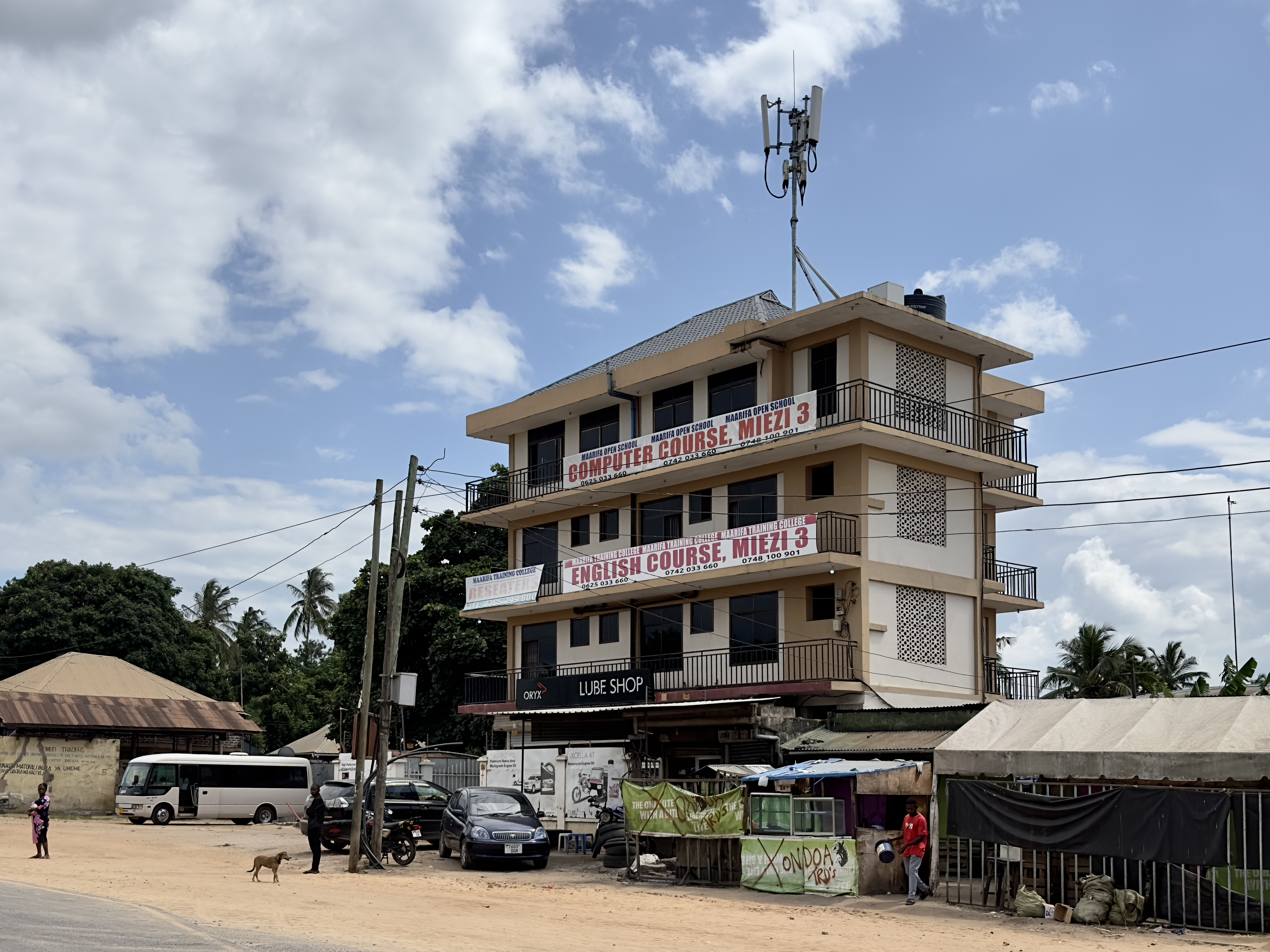
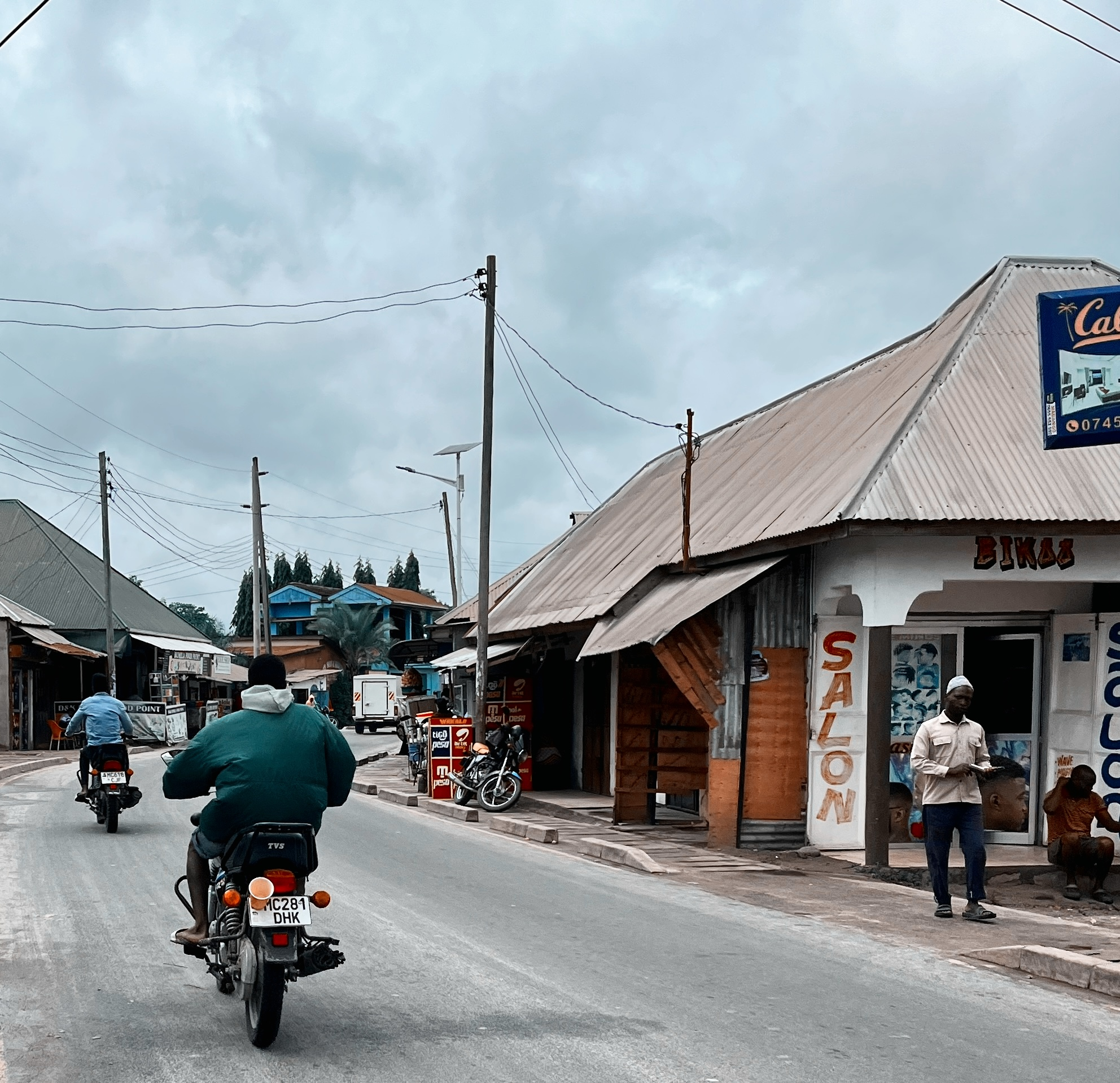
- From top to bottom: Street in Gongolamboto, building in Gongolamboto & Scene in Gongolamboto
- Interactive map of Gongolamboto
- Coordinates: 6°52′56.28″S 39°9′23.04″E
- Country: Tanzania
- Region: Dar es Salaam Region
- District: Ilala District

Area
  - Total: 12.3 km^{2} (4.7 sq mi)

Population (2022)
  - Total: 63,043

Ethnic groups
  - Settler: Swahili
  - Ancestral: Zaramo
- Tanzanian Postal Code: 12110

Gongolamboto or also Gongo la Mboto (Kata ya Gongolamboto, in Swahili) is an administrative ward of the Ilala Municipical Council of the Dar es Salaam Region in Tanzania. Kinyerezi ward encircles the ward on its northern side. Ukonga is to the east, and Majohe Ward is to the south. Pugu is to the west. The ward is known for the 2011 Dar es Salaam explosions. In old colonial maps the area is spelled Kongoramboto. According to the 2022 census, the ward has a total population of 63,043.

== Administration ==
The postal code for the Gongolamboto ward is 12110. The ward is divided into the following neighborhoods (Mitaa):

- Gongo la Mboto, Gongolamboto
- Guluka Kwalala

- Ulongoni "A"
- Ulongoni "B"

=== Government ===
The ward, like every other ward in the country, has local government offices based on the population served.The Gongolamboto Ward administration building houses a court as per the Ward Tribunal Act of 1988, including other vital departments for the administration the ward. The ward has the following administration offices:

- Gongolamboto Police Station
- Gongolamboto Government Office (Afisa Mtendaji)
- Gongolamboto Ward Tribunal (Baraza La Kata)

In the local government system of Tanzania, the ward is the smallest democratic unit. Each ward is composed of a committee of eight elected council members which include a chairperson, one salaried officer (with no voting rights), and an executive officer. One-third of seats are reserved for women councillors.

== Demographics ==
The ward serves as the Zaramo people's ancestral home, along with much of the district. As the city developed throughout time, the ward became into a cosmopolitan ward. In total, 63,043 people called the ward home in 2022.

== Education and health ==
=== Education ===
The ward is home to these educational institutions

- Jeshini Primary School, Gongolamboto
- Markaz Islamic Primary School
- Maarifa Primary School
- Mwangaza Primary School, Gongolamboto
- Ulongoni Primary School
- Mikongeni Primary School
- Highmount Primary School
- Ulongoni "A" Primary School
- Good Faith Primary School
- Muhanga Primary School
- Gongolamboto Secondary School
- Highview Secondary School
- Markaz Islamic Secondary School
- Thomas High School, Gongolamboto
- Lua Secondary School
- Sullivan Provost School
- Future World Vocational Institute, Gongolamboto
- Kampala International University, Dar es Salaam

=== Healthcare ===
The ward is home to the following health institutions:

- Labulax Dispensary
- Bahari Dispensary, Gongolamboto
- Gongolamboto Health Center
- Mama Anitha Health Center
- Edney Health Center
- Goshen Diagnostic Health Center
- Mselem Health Center
