= Kampala International University in Tanzania =

University in Tanzania

Coordinates: 6°53′11″S 39°9′22″E

Kampala International University In Tanzania (KIUT)
- Swahili: Chuo Kikuu cha Kimataifa cha Kampala nchini Tanzania
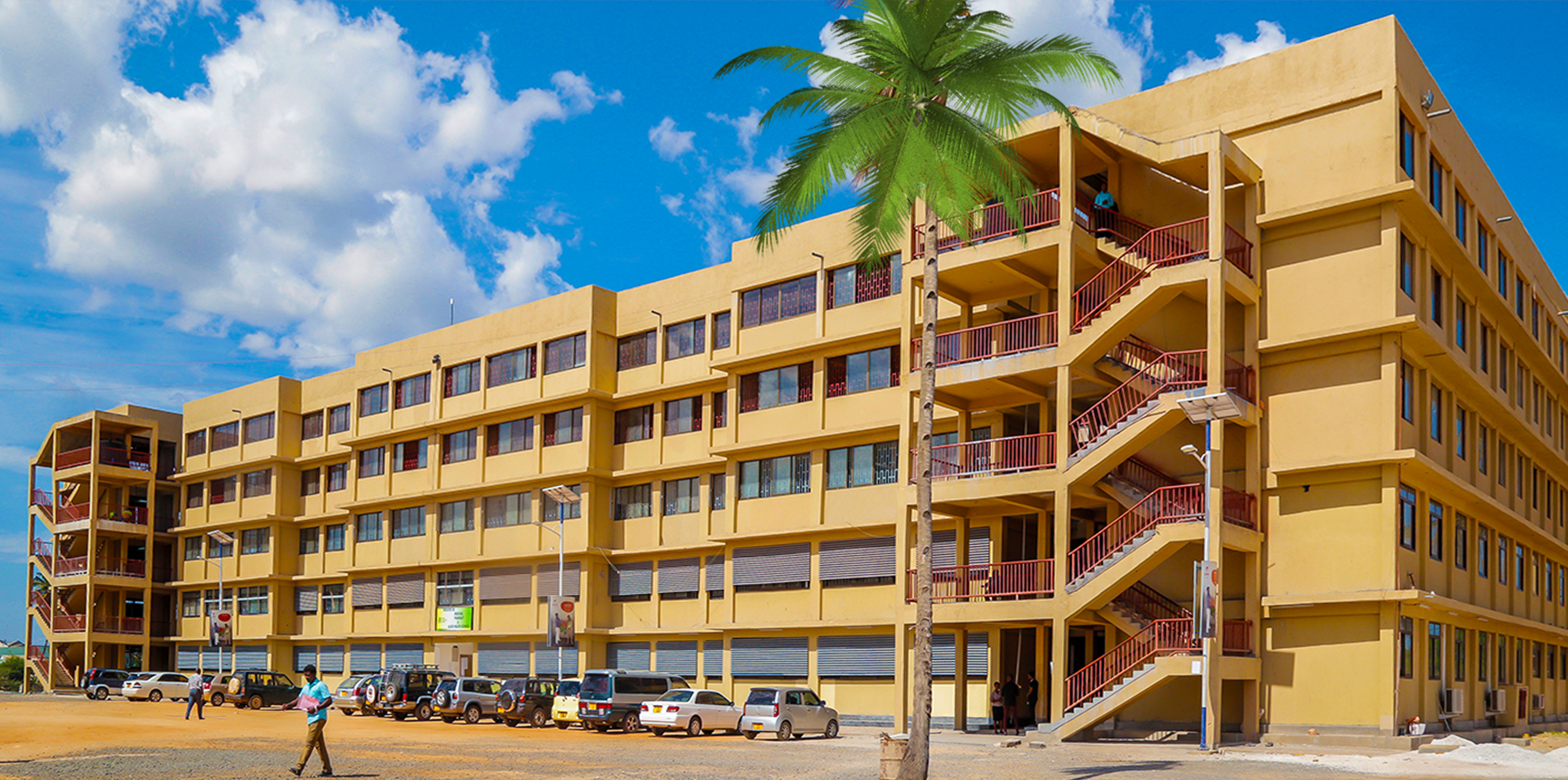
- Former name: Kampala International University
- Motto: Exploring the Heights
- Type: Private
- Established: 2008; 18 years ago
- Chancellor: Alhaji Ali Hassan Mwinyi
- Vice-Chancellor: Professor Angwara D. Kiwara
- Location: Dar es Salaam, Ilala, Tanzania
- Campus: Gongo la Mboto, in Ilala City, 148 acres
- Website: www.kiut.ac.tz

Kampala International University in Tanzania (KIUT) is a private university located in Gongo la Mboto ward of Ilala City in Dar es Salaam, Tanzania.

== History ==
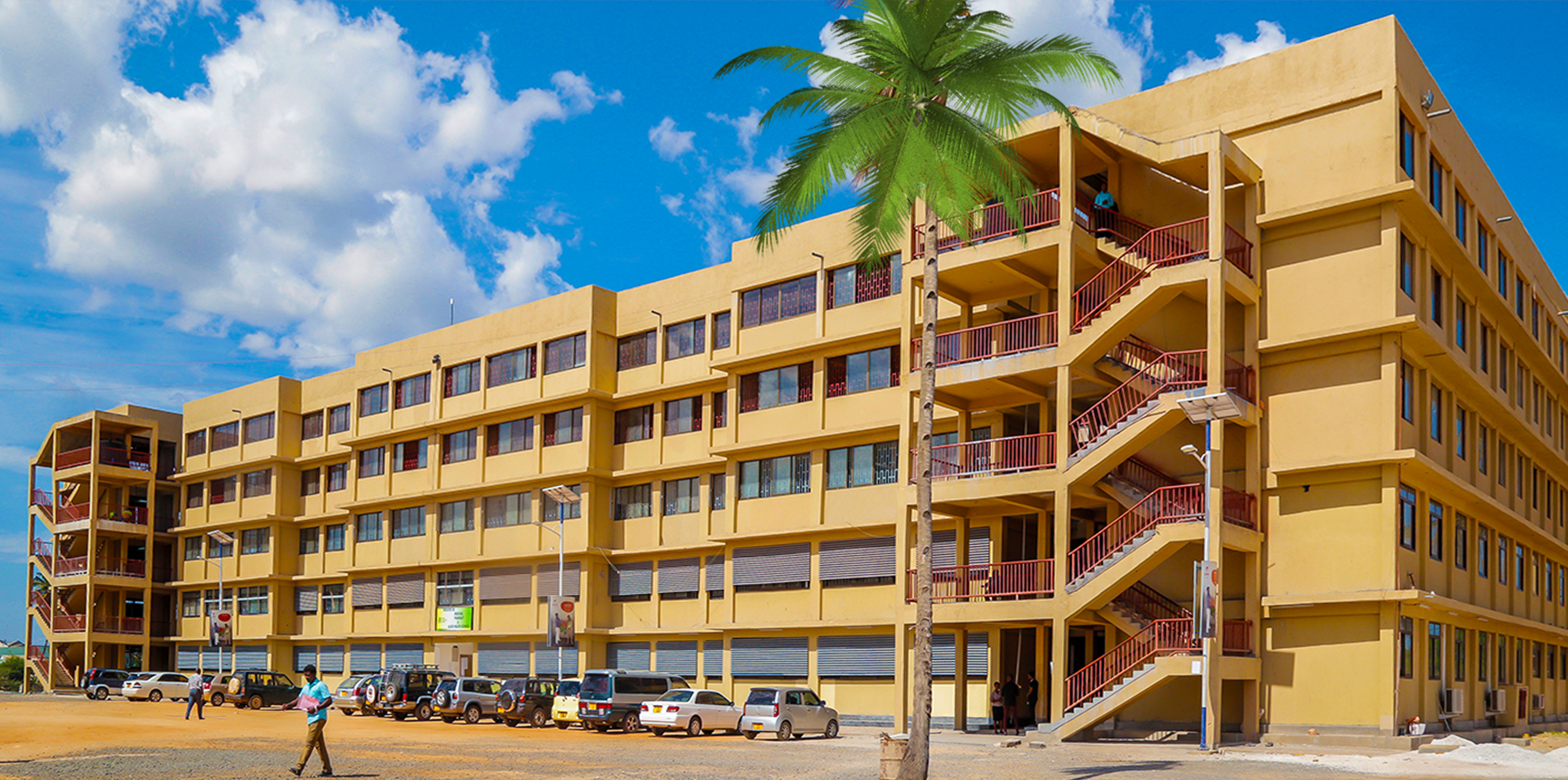
Health Science & Allied Science Building

Kampala International University in Tanzania (KIUT) was established in Tanzania in 2008 as a Dar es Salaam Constituent College of Kampala International University in Uganda. It was then known as Dar es Salaam Constituent College affiliated to the Kampala International University (KIU-DCC). The main goal of the college was to run academic and professional courses offered by Kampala International University (KIU) through the Open and Distance Learning (ODL) mode of course delivery.

KIU-DCC's initial main office location address was at the 8th Floor of Posta House Building along the Uganda/Ohio street junction in the Dar es Salaam metropolis, opposite the then offices of the Higher Education Accreditation Council (HEAC) that later changed to the Tanzania Commission for Universities (TCU). In November 2009, the College main office was relocated to the Quality Plaza Building along the current Julius K. Nyerere Road. The growth in student numbers, in 2010, reflected in the number of applications received for admission, forced the college leadership to search for a new permanent location that would facilitate the offer of university education through both ODL and residential modes of course delivery. This move was, in part, the effort of the then leadership of KIU-DCC to respond to social demand, particularly by Tanzanian youth, for more places to pursue Higher Learning studies. Ultimately, the college leadership managed to acquire, from the Hon. Kate Kamba's family, a 148-acre piece of land in the Gongo la Mboto Village, in Ilala District, still in the Dar es Salaam Region.

On 15 January 2011, the Tanzania Commission for Universities (TCU) issued the college interim recognition through granting the KIU-DCC a Certificate of Provisional Registration (CPR) and, later on 27 September 2012, issuing the College a Certificate of Full Registration (CFR). Five years later, vide a letter referenced CB.40/78/01/51, dated 17 July 2017, the Tanzania Commission for Universities (TCU) approved the aspired new status of KIU-DCC as a full-fledged university under the new name of “The Kampala International University in Tanzania (KIUT)”. The university's first chancellor was and still is His Excellency, Ali Hassan Mwinyi, the retired Third Phase President of Zanzibar as well as being the retired Second Phase President of the United Republic of Tanzania.

== Courses Offered ==
Kampala International University in Tanzania offers an array of courses at certificate level through to master's level with other courses in the pipeline. The University offers the following courses at these different levels:

Certificate Level Courses

1. Technician Certificate in Clinical Medicine
2. Technician Certificate in Pharmaceutical Sciences
3. Technician Certificate in Medical Laboratory Sciences
4. Technician Certificate in Environmental Health Sciences
5. Certificate in Business Administration
6. Certificate in Strategic Marketing Management
7. Certificate in Human Resources Management
8. Certificate in Public Administration
9. Certificate in Information Technology
10. Certificate in Laws

Diploma Level Courses

1. Ordinary Diploma in Clinical Medicine
2. Ordinary Diploma in Pharmaceutical Sciences
3. Ordinary Diploma in Medical Laboratory Sciences
4. Ordinary Diploma in Environmental Health Sciences
5. Diploma in Business Administration
6. Diploma in Marketing Management
7. Diploma in Human Resources Management
8. Diploma in Supplies and Procurement Management
9. Diploma in Public Administration
10. Diploma in Social Work and Social Administration
11. Diploma in Computer Science
12. Diploma in Laws

Bachelor's Degree Level Courses

1. Bachelor of Medicine and Bachelor of Surgery
2. Bachelor of Pharmacy
3. Bachelor of Medical Laboratory Sciences
4. Bachelor of Business Administration (Accounting)
5. Bachelor of Business Administration (Finance and Banking)
6. Bachelor of Business Administration (Marketing Management)
7. Bachelor of Business Administration (Human Resources Management)
8. Bachelor of Business Administration (Supplies and Procurement Management)
9. Bachelor of Public Administration
10. Bachelor of Social Work and Social Administration
11. Bachelor of Computer Science
12. Bachelor of Information Technology
13. Bachelor of Laws
14. Bachelor of Arts with Education - History, Geography, Kiswahili & English
15. Bachelor of Science with Education - Chemistry, Biology, and Mathematics

Postgraduate Diploma Level Courses

1. Postgraduate Diploma in Education

Master's Degree Level Courses

1. Master of Public Health
2. Master of Public Administration
3. Master of Educational Management and Administration
