= Msongola =

Ward of Ilala District, Dar es Salaam Region

Msongola Kata ya Msongola (Swahili)
- Ward of Ilala District
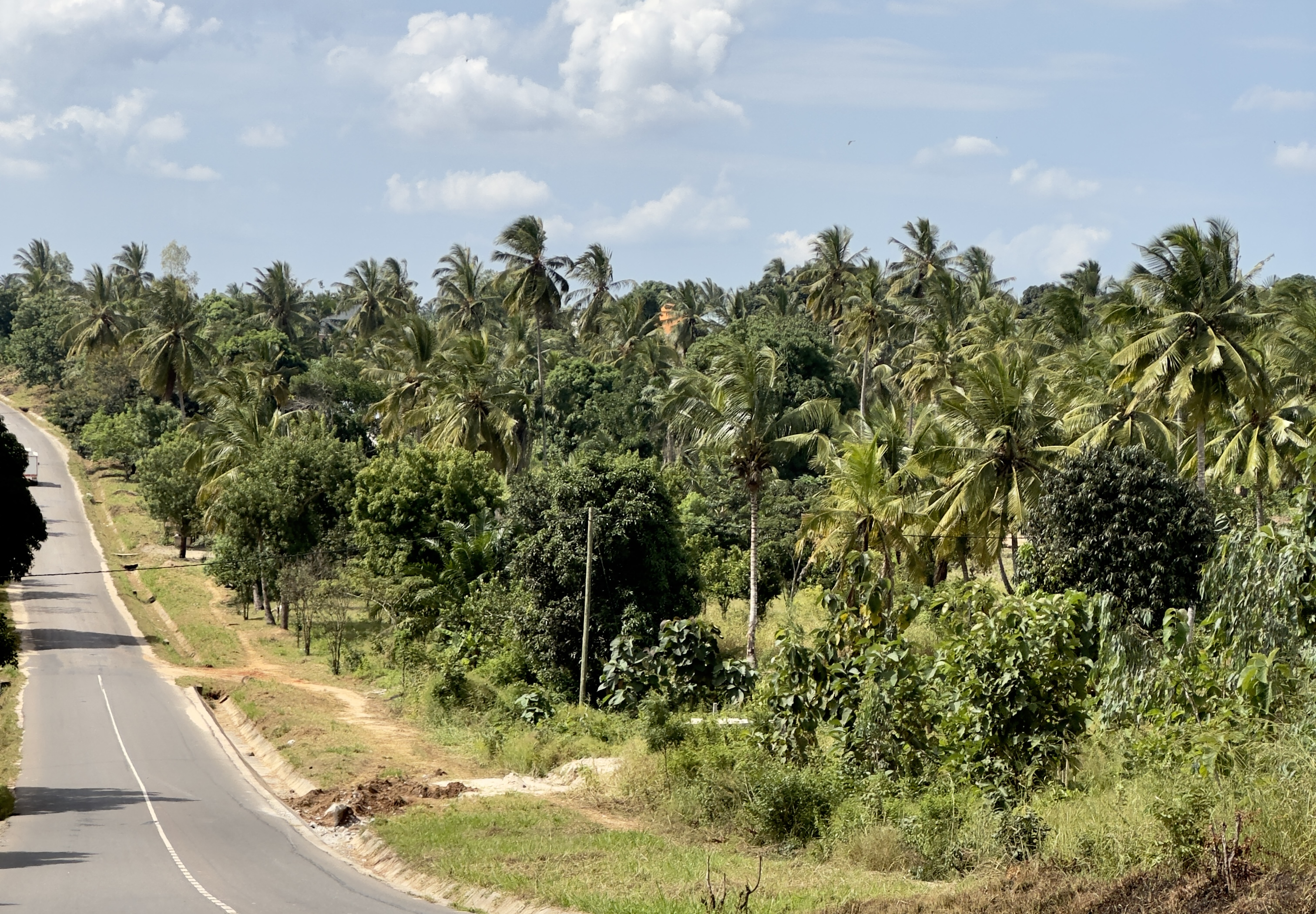
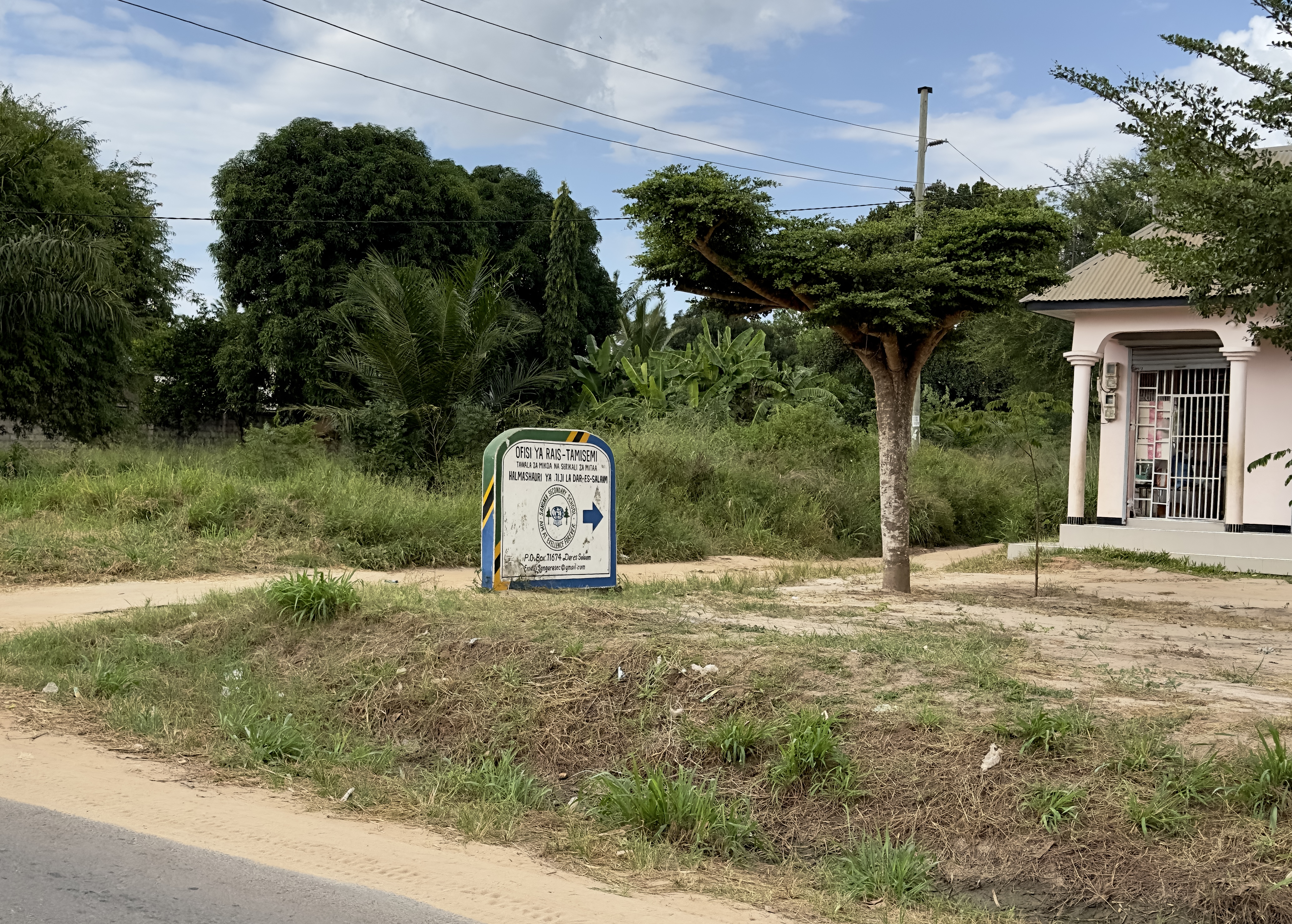
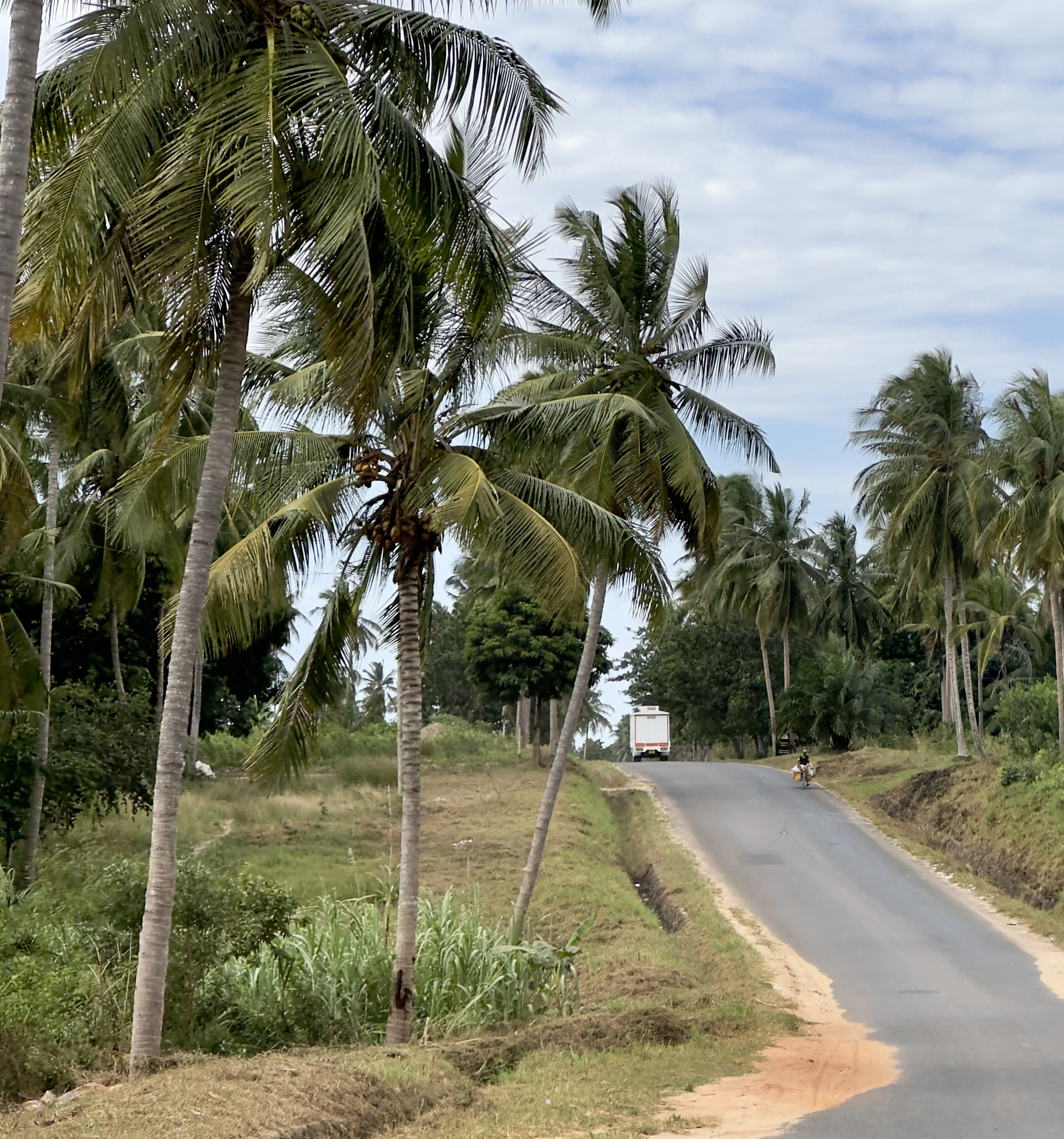
- From top to bottom: Coconuts in Msongola ward, Sangara Secondary School in Msongola & road through Msongola ward
- Nickname: Ilala's green ward
- Interactive map of Msongola
- Coordinates: 6°58′19.92″S 39°10′33.24″E
- Country: Tanzania
- Region: Dar es Salaam Region
- District: Ilala District

Area
  - Total: 57.98 km^{2} (22.39 sq mi)

Population (2012)
  - Total: 81,646

Ethnic groups
  - Settler: Swahili
  - Ancestral: Zaramo
- Tanzanian Postal Code: 12114

Msongola (Kata ya Msongola, in Swahili) is an administrative ward of the Ilala Municipical Council of the Dar es Salaam Region in Tanzania. Kivule and Chamazi border the ward to the north. By Chanika and Majohe to the west. Mkuranga and Tambani (Exclave) wards of the Mkuranga District of the Pwani Region border the ward on its southern side. The Main Tambani ward of Pwani Region's Mkuranga District borders the ward on the east. According to the 2012 census, the ward has a total population of 81,646.

== Administration ==
The postal code for the Msongola ward is 12114. The ward is divided into the following neighborhoods (Mitaa):

- Kiboga
- Kidole
- Kitonga
- Mbondole
- Mkera

- Mvuleni
- Sangara
- Uwanja wa Nyani
- Yangeyange

=== Government ===
The ward, like every other ward in the country, has local government offices based on the population served.The Msongola Ward administration building houses a court as per the Ward Tribunal Act of 1988, including other vital departments for the administration the ward. The ward has the following administration offices:

- Msongola Police Station
- Msongola Government Office (Afisa Mtendaji)
- Msongola Ward Tribunal (Baraza La Kata) is a Department inside Ward Government Office

In the local government system of Tanzania, the ward is the smallest democratic unit. Each ward is composed of a committee of eight elected council members which include a chairperson, one salaried officer (with no voting rights), and an executive officer. One-third of seats are reserved for women councillors.

== Demographics ==
The ward serves as the Zaramo people's ancestral home, along with much of the district. As the city developed throughout time, the ward became into a cosmopolitan ward. In total, 81,646 people called the ward home in 2012.

== Education and health ==
=== Education ===
The ward is home to these educational institutions

- Sangara Secondary School, Msongola
- Kitonga Primary School
- Yangeyange Primary School
- Kitonga Secondary School
- Ahmadiyya Secondary School

=== Healthcare ===
The ward is home to the following health institutions:

- Luhanga Health Center
- Msongola Health Training Institute
- Msongola Health Center.
