= Ukonga =

Ward of Ilala District, Dar es Salaam Region

Ukonga Kata ya Ukonga (Swahili)
- Ward of Ilala District
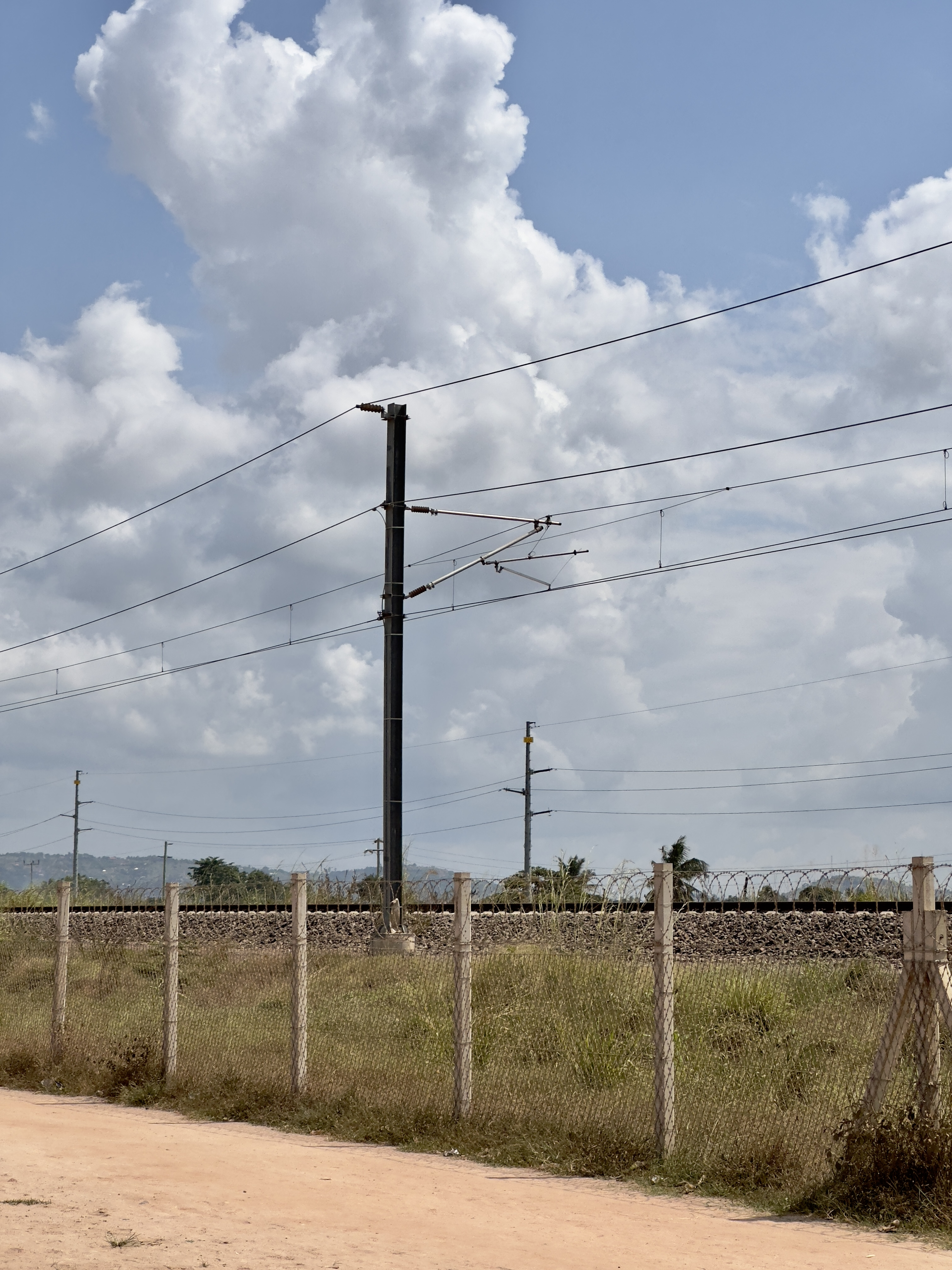
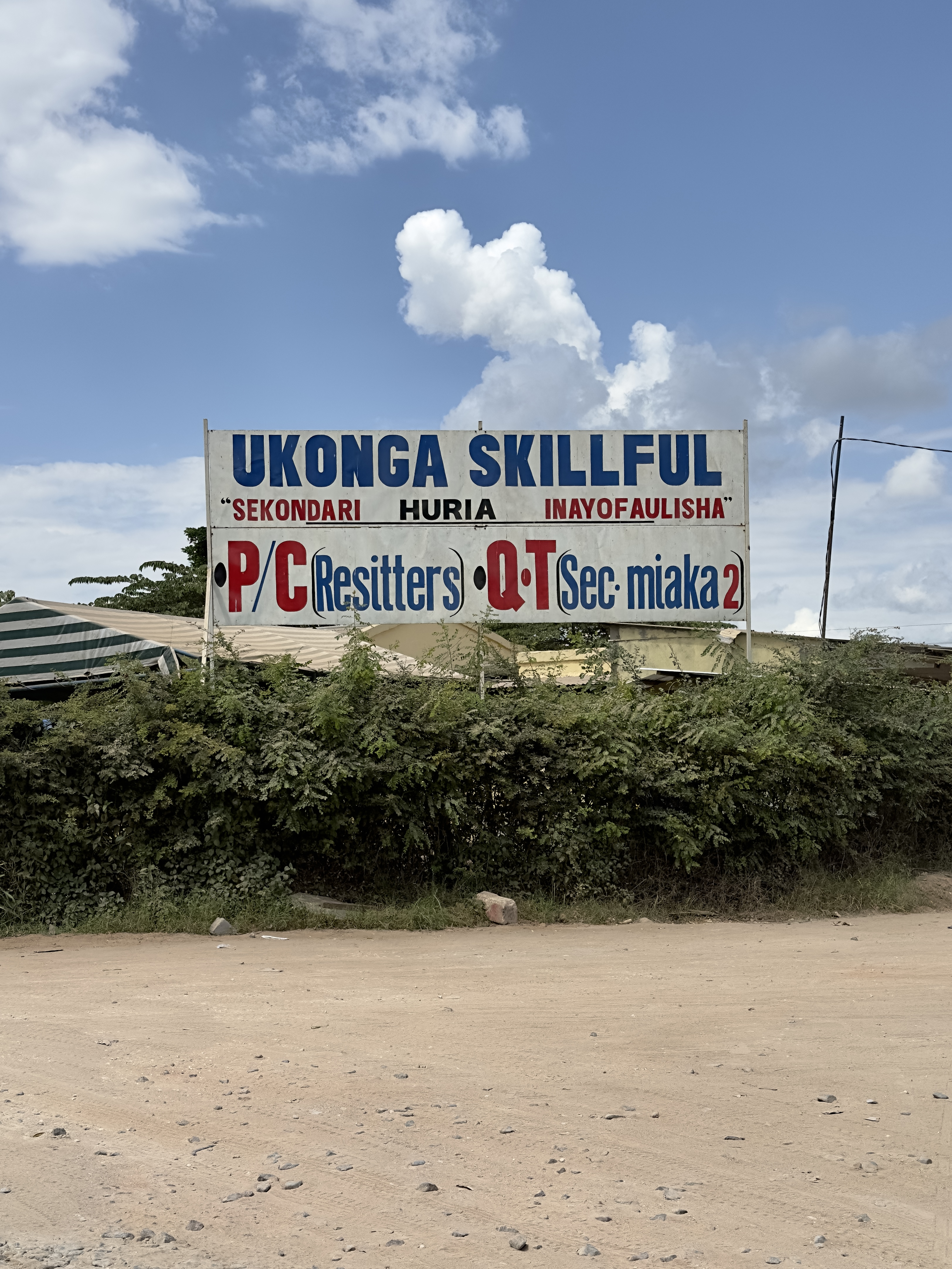
- From top to bottom: SGR through Ukonga & Signage in Ukonga ward
- Interactive map of Ukonga
- Coordinates: 6°52′35.04″S 39°10′17.04″E
- Country: Tanzania
- Region: Dar es Salaam Region
- District: Ilala District

Area
  - Total: 9.9 km^{2} (3.8 sq mi)

Population (2012)
  - Total: 80,034

Ethnic groups
  - Settler: Swahili
  - Ancestral: Zaramo
- Tanzanian Postal Code: 12107

Ukonga (Kata ya Ukonga, in Swahili) is an administrative ward of the Ilala Municipical Council of the Dar es Salaam Region in Tanzania. Kinyerezi forms the ward's northern boundary. To the east is Kipawa, and to the south are Kivule and Majohe. Gongolamboto ward is to the west. According to the 2012 census, the ward has a total population of 80,034.

== Administration ==
The postal code for the Ukonga ward is 12107. The ward is divided into the following neighborhoods (Mitaa):

- Markaz
- Mazizini
- Mongo la Ndege

- Mwembe Madafu
- Sabasaba, Ukonga

=== Government ===
The ward, like every other ward in the country, has local government offices based on the population served.The Ukonga Ward administration building houses a court as per the Ward Tribunal Act of 1988, including other vital departments for the administration the ward. The ward has the following administration offices:

- Ukonga Police Station
- Ukonga Government Office (Afisa Mtendaji)
- Ukonga Ward Tribunal (Baraza La Kata) is a Department inside Ward Government Office

In the local government system of Tanzania, the ward is the smallest democratic unit. Each ward is composed of a committee of eight elected council members which include a chairperson, one salaried officer (with no voting rights), and an executive officer. One-third of seats are reserved for women councillors.

== Demographics ==
The ward serves as the Zaramo people's ancestral home, along with much of the district. As the city developed throughout time, the ward became into a cosmopolitan ward. In total, 80,034 people called the ward home in 2012.

== Education and health ==
=== Education ===
The ward is home to these educational institutions

- Muhango Secondary School
- Rosehill Secondary School
- Holy Trinity Primary School
- Ukonga Primary School
- St. Therese Primary School
- Ukonga Jica Primary School
- Mizambarauni Primary School
- Gof Primary School
- Amani Primary School, Ukonga
- ABC Capital Primary School
- Kinyamwezi Secondary School, Ukonga

=== Healthcare ===
The ward is home to the following health institutions:

- Pio Specialized Polyclinic (Gongo La Mboto, Mzambarauni)
- Kitonka Hospital
- Cardinal Rugambwa Hospital
- Livinglight Enterprises Limited
