= Shaniqua =

Female given name

- Pronunciation: /ʃəˈniːkwə/ shə-NEE-kwə
- Gender: Female
- Language: English

Origin
- Meaning: None (invented)
- Region of origin: United States (African-American community)

Other names
- Alternative spelling: Chanequa, Chineequa, Shanequa, Shenequa, Sheniqua
- Variant forms: Chanique, Shanica, Shanique, Shenique, Shinique
- Related names: African-American names

Shaniqua is a female given name, originating in the African-American community, gaining popularity beginning in the 1970s and peaking in the early 1990s. It is often given as the prototypical example of a "ghetto name", i.e. a name likely to belong to low-income African-Americans, and has been used in racism-related incidents to stereotype "rude" Black women.

== People with the name Shaniqua or close variations ==
- Chamique Holdsclaw (born 1977), American WNBA player
- Chanequa Walker-Barnes, American theologian and psychologist
- Chanique Rabe (born 1997), Namibian model and fashion designer
- Linda Miles (born 1978), American professional wrestler who went by the name Shaniqua
- Shanica Knowles (born 1990), American actress and singer
- Shaniqua Okwok, British actress
- Shaniqua Tompkins, former partner of rapper 50 Cent
- Shanique Dessing (born 2000), Dutch footballer
- Shanique Speight (born 1978), American politician
- Sheniqua Ferguson (born 1989), Bahamian sprinter
- Sheniqua "Nikki" Greene (born 1990), American basketball player
- Sheniqua Thomas (born 1998), Barbadian netball player
- Shenique Fortune, Antigua and Barbuda politician
- Shinique Smith (born 1971), American visual artist

== Other uses ==
- "Shaniqua" (song), a 2001 hip-hop song that achieved minor commercial success.
- The name was the namesake of the 2016 documentary Searching for Shaniqua, directed by an Old Dominion University English language professor. According to Vibe magazine journalist Shenequa Golding, the documentary was well-received, exploring the stereotypes surrounding this name often given to Black children and the difficulties faced by those bearing the name. It won the 2016 HBO Best Documentary at Martha's Vineyard African American Film Festival.

== See also ==
- Chanika (disambiguation)
- Shanika
