= Shanika Roberts-Odle =

Barbadian politician

Member of the Senate of Barbados
- In office January 2022 – January 2024

Administrator of the Barbados Medicinal Cannabis Licensing Authority
- In office January 2018 – June 2022

CEO (Ag.) of the Barbados Medicinal Cannabis Licensing Authority
- In office July 2022 – Current

Personal details
- Party: Barbados Labour Party

Shanika Roberts-Odle is a Barbadian politician who served as a member of the Senate of Barbados from January 2022 to January 2024. She is a member of the First senate of Barbados constituted after Barbados became a republic by Prime Minister Mia Mottley. She is a member of the Barbados Labour Party. Previously she had served as the Administrator of the Barbados Medicinal Cannabis Licensing Authority.
