= Chanika, Ilala =

Ward in Dar es Salaam Region, Tanzania

Chanika Kata ya Chanika (Swahili)
- Ward of Ilala District
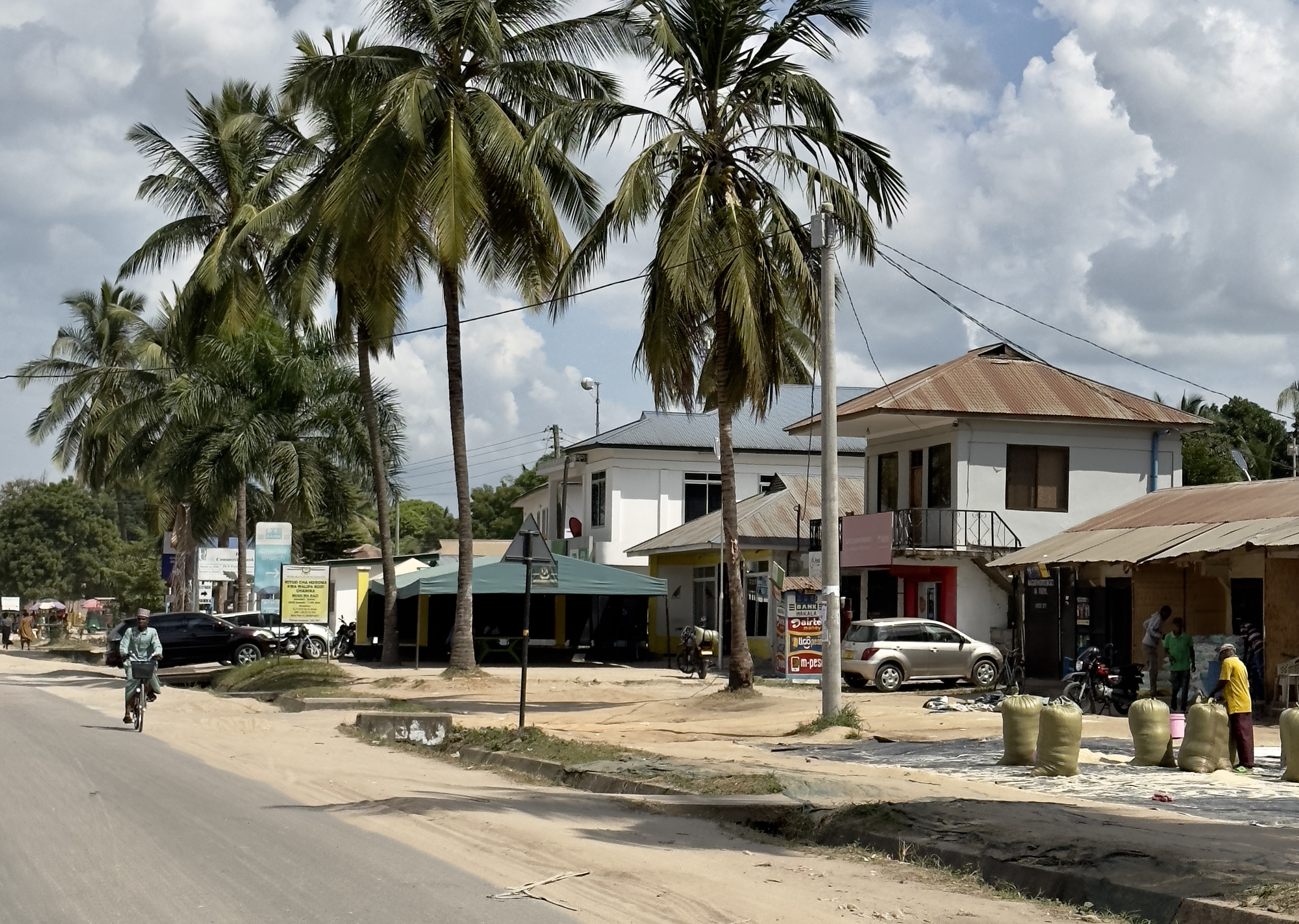
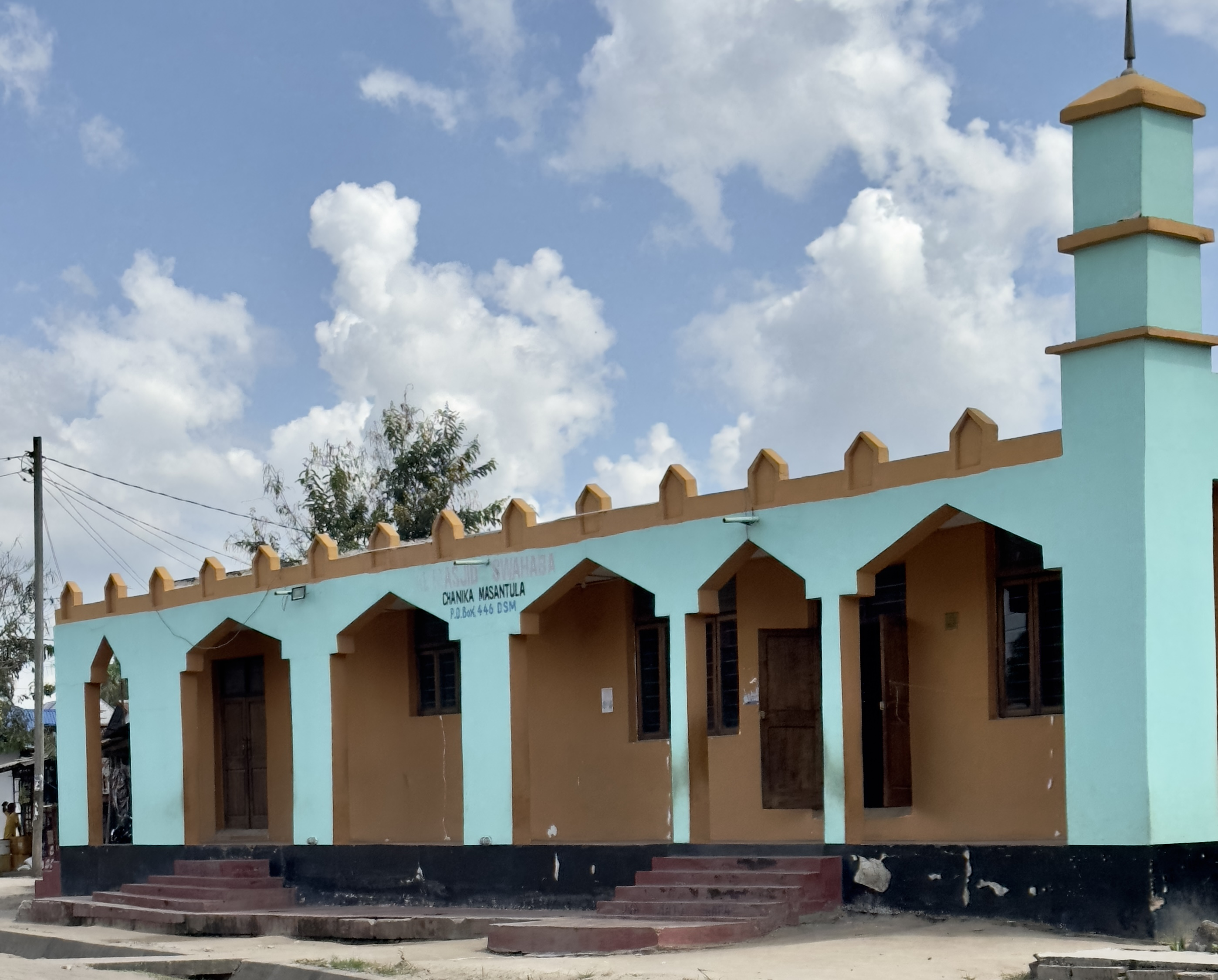
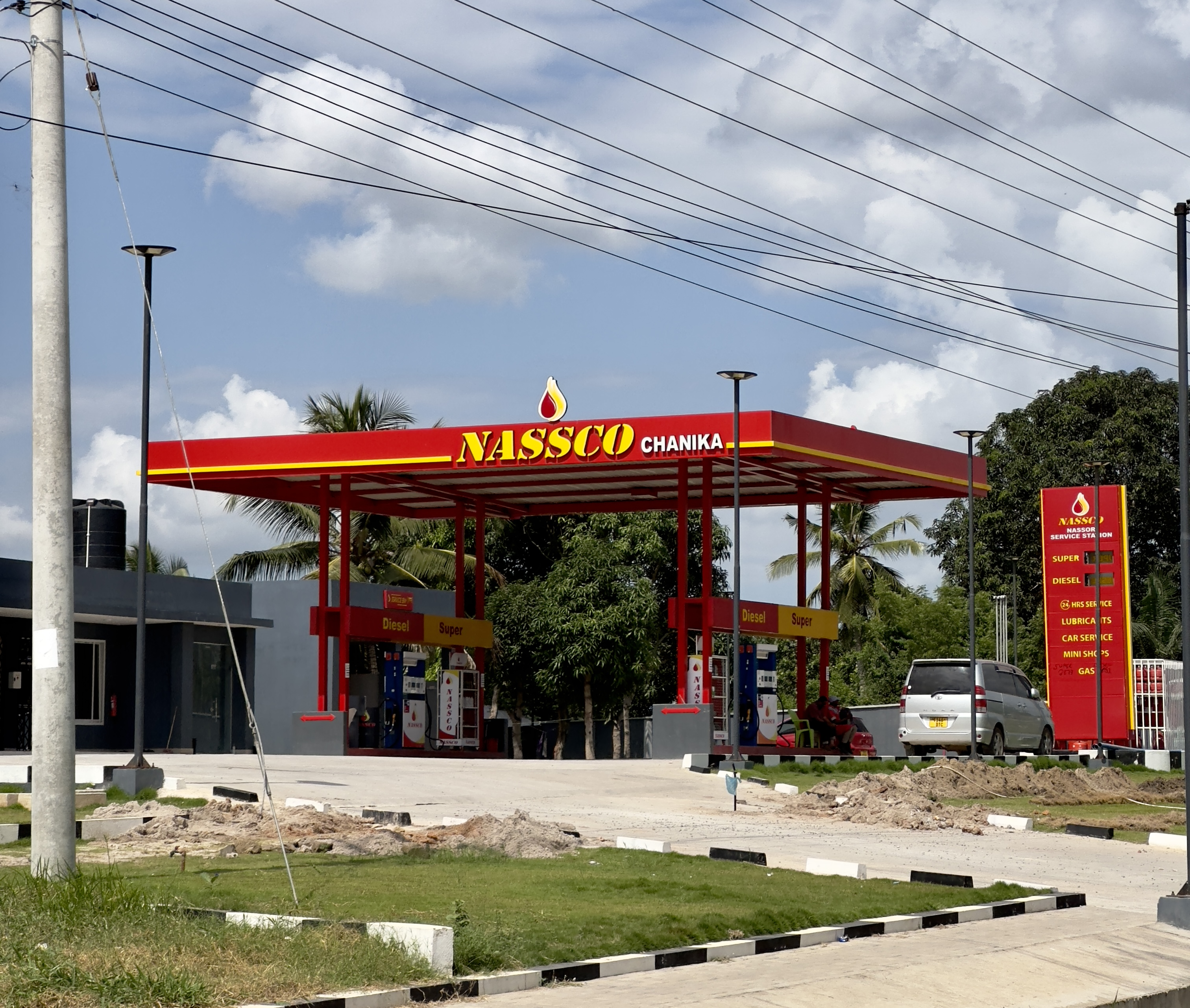
- From top to bottom: Scene in Chanika, Masjid Chanika & Petrol station in Chanika
- Interactive map of Chanika
- Coordinates: 7°0′13.68″S 39°4′52.32″E
- Country: Tanzania
- Region: Dar es Salaam Region
- District: Ilala District

Area
  - Total: 58.7 km^{2} (22.7 sq mi)

Population (2022)
  - Total: 75,271

Ethnic groups
  - Settler: Swahili
  - Ancestral: Zaramo
- Tanzanian Postal Code: 12115

Chanika (Kata ya Chanika, in Swahili) is an administrative ward of the Ilala Municipical Council of the Dar es Salaam Region in Tanzania. Majohe ward encircles the ward on its northern edge. Tambani Ward of the Mkuranga District in the Pwani Region lies to the south, while Msongola is to the east. The Msimbu and Kisarawe wards of the Kisarawe District in the Pwani Region are also to the west. According to the 2022 census, the ward has a total population of 75,271.

== Administration ==
The postal code for the Chanika ward is 12115. The ward is divided into the following neighborhoods (Mitaa):

- Kidugalo
- Lukomi
- Lukooni
- Nguvu Mpya
- Ngwale

- Tungini
- Vikongoro
- Virobo
- Yongwe

=== Government ===
The ward, like every other ward in the country, has local government offices based on the population served.The Chanika Ward administration building houses a court as per the Ward Tribunal Act of 1988, including other vital departments for the administration the ward. The ward has the following administration offices:

- Chanika Police Station
- Chanika Government Office (Afisa Mtendaji)
- Chanika Ward Tribunal (Baraza La Kata) is a Department inside Ward Government Office

In the local government system of Tanzania, the ward is the smallest democratic unit. Each ward is composed of a committee of eight elected council members which include a chairperson, one salaried officer (with no voting rights), and an executive officer. One-third of seats are reserved for women councillors.

== Demographics ==
The ward serves as the Zaramo people's ancestral home, along with much of the district. As the city developed throughout time, the ward became into a cosmopolitan ward. In total, 75,271 people called the ward home in 2022.

== Education and health ==
=== Education ===
The ward is home to these educational institutions

- Chanika Primary School
- Benedict Primary School
- Dololo Primary School
- Kimwani Primary School
- Daily Life Primary School
- Kidugalo Primary School
- Lukooni Primary School
- Winga Primary School
- Mvuti Primary School
- Mkuchembe Primary School
- Kibadeni Primary School
- Zingiziwa Secondary School
- Didas Masaburi Secondary School
- Chanika Secondary School
- Furaha Secondary School, Chanika
- Nguvu Mpya Secondary School
- Msimbu Secondary School
- City College of Health and Allied Sciences, Chanika

=== Healthcare ===
The ward is home to the following health institutions:

- Luqman Dispensary
- Luhanga Health Center
- Arafa Health Center, Chanika
- Bi Mkasi Health Center
- Chanika Health Center
- Buyuni Health Center, Chanika
- Hebab Health Center
- Tikaya Health Center
- Chanika Maternity Hospital
