= Kivule =

Ward of Ilala District, Dar es Salaam Region

Kivule Kata ya Kivule (Swahili)
- Ward of Ilala District
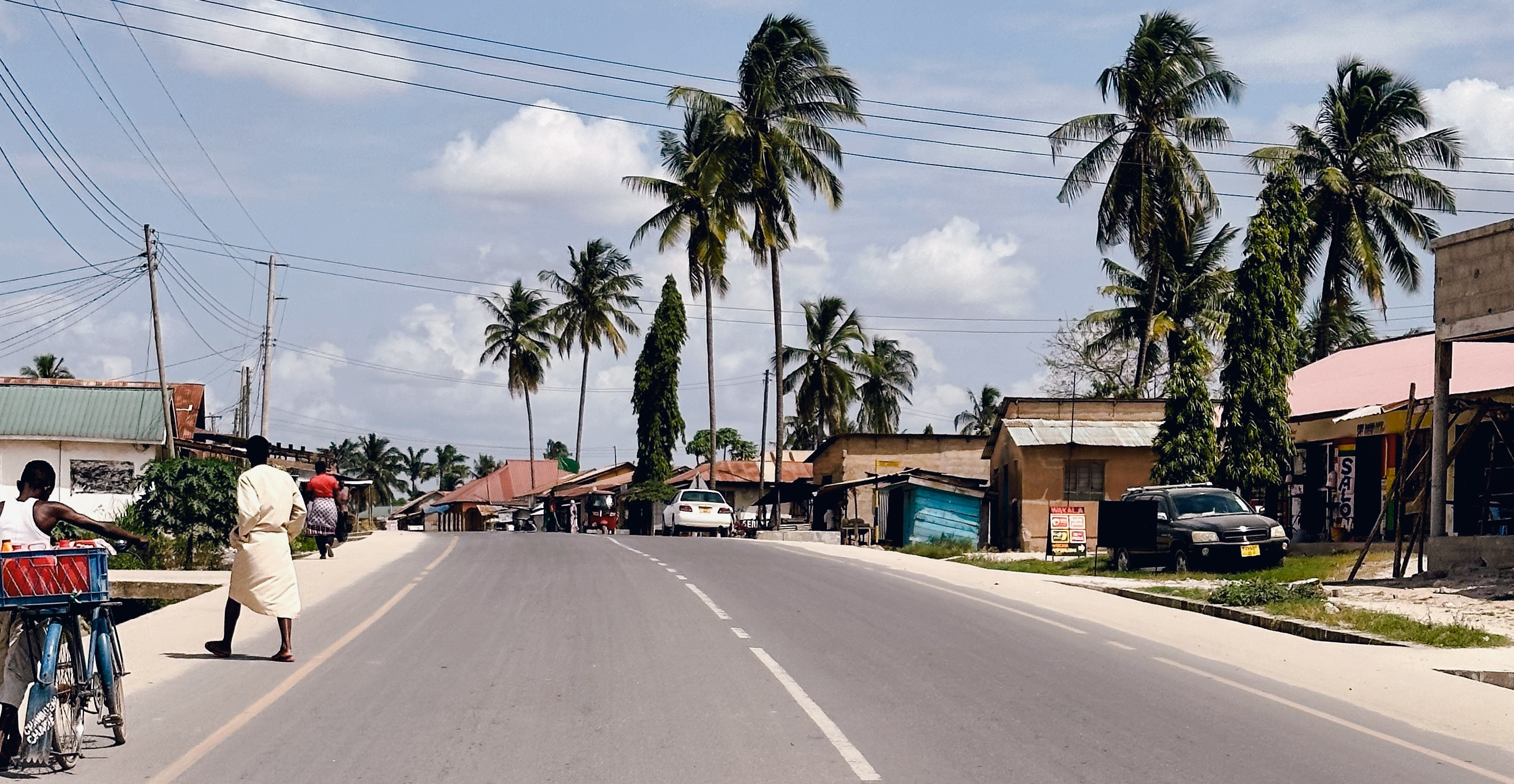
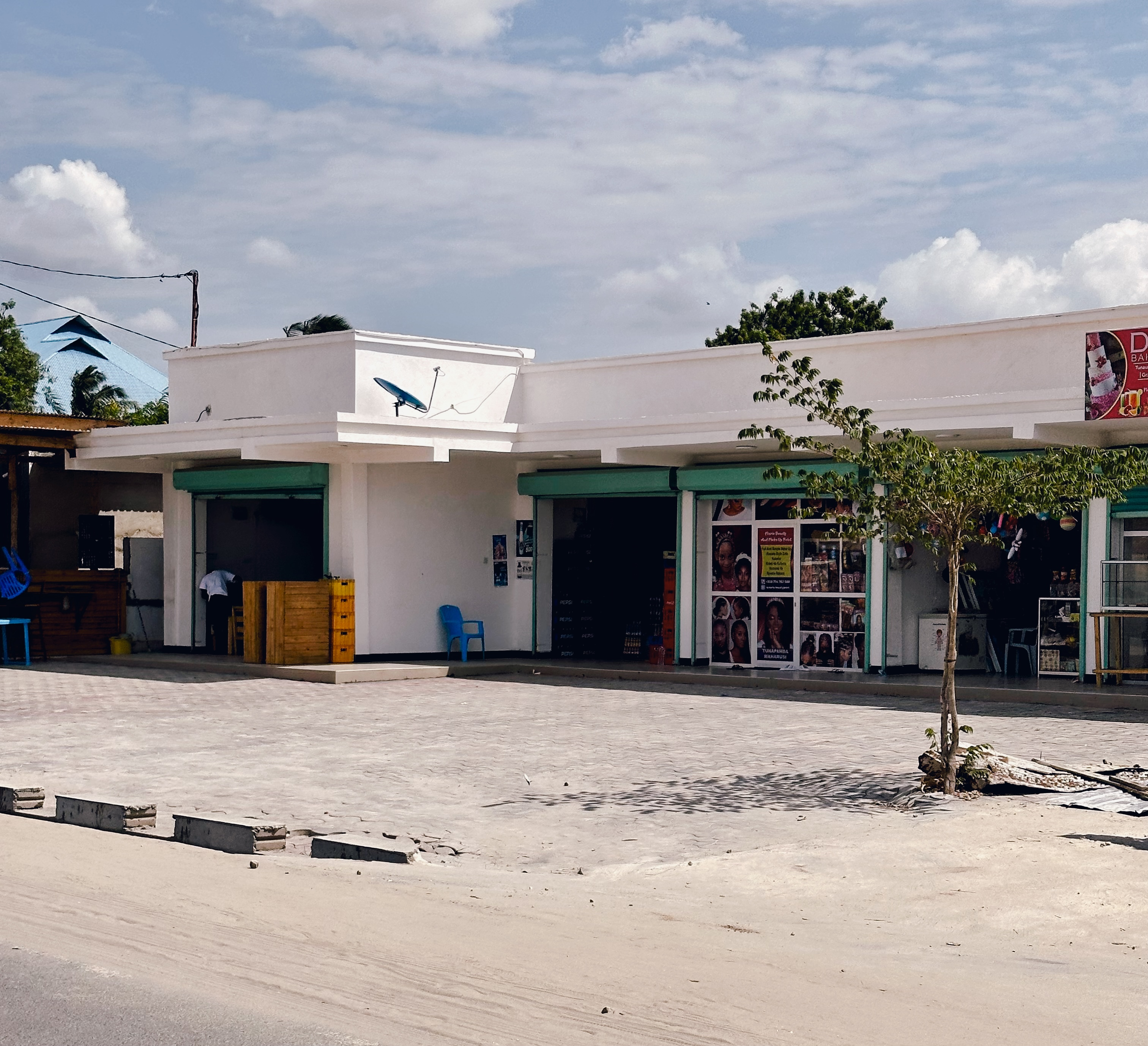
- From top to bottom: Street in Kivule & Shop in Kivule
- Interactive map of Kivule
- Coordinates: 6°56′0.06″S 39°11′1.32″E
- Country: Tanzania
- Region: Dar es Salaam Region
- District: Ilala District

Area
  - Total: 24.9 km^{2} (9.6 sq mi)

Population (2022)
  - Total: 88,273

Ethnic groups
  - Settler: Swahili
  - Ancestral: Zaramo
- Tanzanian Postal Code: 12117

Kivule (Kata ya Kivule, in Swahili) is an administrative ward of the Ilala Municipal Council of the Dar es Salaam Region in Tanzania. Ukonga and Kipawa border the ward's northern boundary. Kitunda borders the east of the ward. Chamazi and Msongola are in the south; the former is located in Temeke MC. Majohe is to the west. According to the 2022 census, the ward has a total population of 88,273.

== Administration ==
The postal code for the Kivule ward is 12117. The ward is divided into the following neighborhoods (Mitaa):

- Bombambili
- Karezange

- Kivule
- Magore "A"

=== Government ===
The ward, like every other ward in the country, has local government offices based on the population served.The Kivule Ward administration building houses a court as per the Ward Tribunal Act of 1988, including other vital departments for the administration the ward. The ward has the following administration offices:

- Kivule Police Station
- Kivule Government Office (Afisa Mtendaji)
- Kivule Ward Tribunal (Baraza La Kata) is a Department inside Ward Government Office

In the local government system of Tanzania, the ward is the smallest democratic unit. Each ward is composed of a committee of eight elected council members which include a chairperson, one salaried officer (with no voting rights), and an executive officer. One-third of seats are reserved for women councillors.

== Demographics ==
The ward serves as the Zaramo people's ancestral home, along with much of the district. As the city developed throughout time, the ward became into a cosmopolitan ward. In total, 88,273 people called the ward home in 2022.

== Education and health ==
=== Education ===
The ward is home to these educational institutions

- Zawadi Primary School
- Hope Primary School, Kivule
- Masaka Schools
- Kananura Schools
- Kivule Secondary School
- Sandy Valley Secondary School, Kivule
- Benhubert Secondary School
- Mbonea Secondary School

=== Healthcare ===
The ward is home to the following health institutions:

- Galilaya Health Care Dispensary
- Kitonka Dispensary
- Taifo Charitable Dispensary
- Mebu Health Center
- Kivule District Hospital
