= Kizzy =

Kizzy may refer to:

- Kizzy (entertainer) (born 1979 as Kizzy Yuanda Constance Getrouw), a Dutch actress, singer and television host
- Kizzy Crawford or "Kizzy" (born 1996), a Barbadian-Welsh singer
- Kizzy Edgell (born 2002), British actor
- Kizzy Waller (later Kizzy Lea), a character in the 1976 novel Roots and the 1977 TV miniseries of the same name
- Kizzy "Kiz" Shoemaker, a character from Afterworld (web series)
- Kizzy, a character from Snobs (TV series)
- Kizzy (TV series), a 1976 BBC adaptation of Rumer Godden's novel The Diddakoi
- Kizzy: Mum at 14, a BBC Three documentary about an underage mother, Kizzy Kay Neal
