= Shanika Karunasekera =

Shanika Karunasekera is a Professor in the School of Computing and Information Systems at the University of Melbourne. Dr. Karunasekera completed her Ph.D. in Electrical Engineering from the University of Cambridge, UK in 1995. Earlier she completed her B.Sc. in Electronics and Telecommunication Engineering at the University of Moratuwa, Sri Lanka.

Dr. Karunasekera was born in Sri Lanka.
