= Ilala District =

District of Dar es Salaam Region, Tanzania

Ilala District Halimashauri ya Manispaa ya Ilala (Swahili)
- District of Dar es Salaam
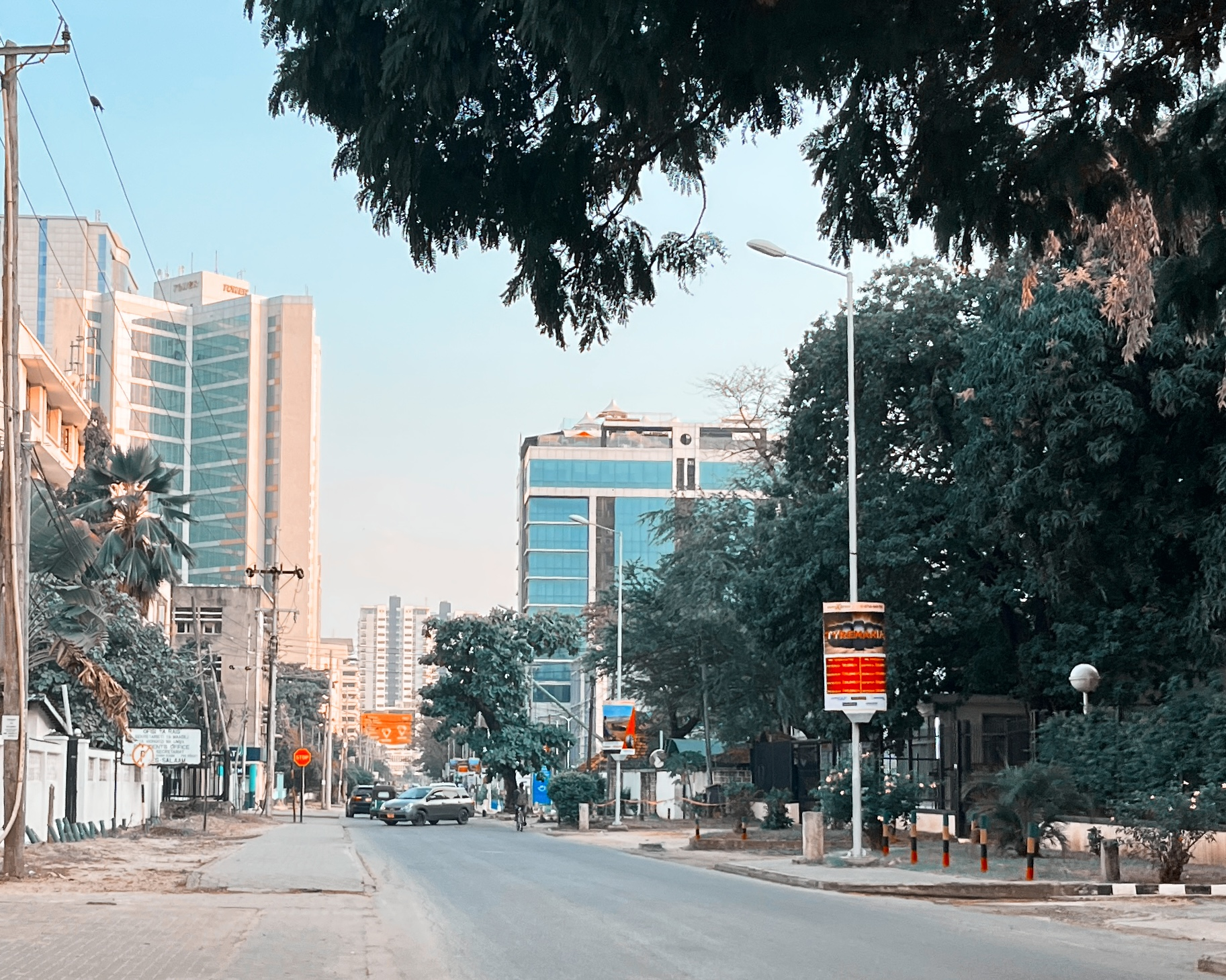
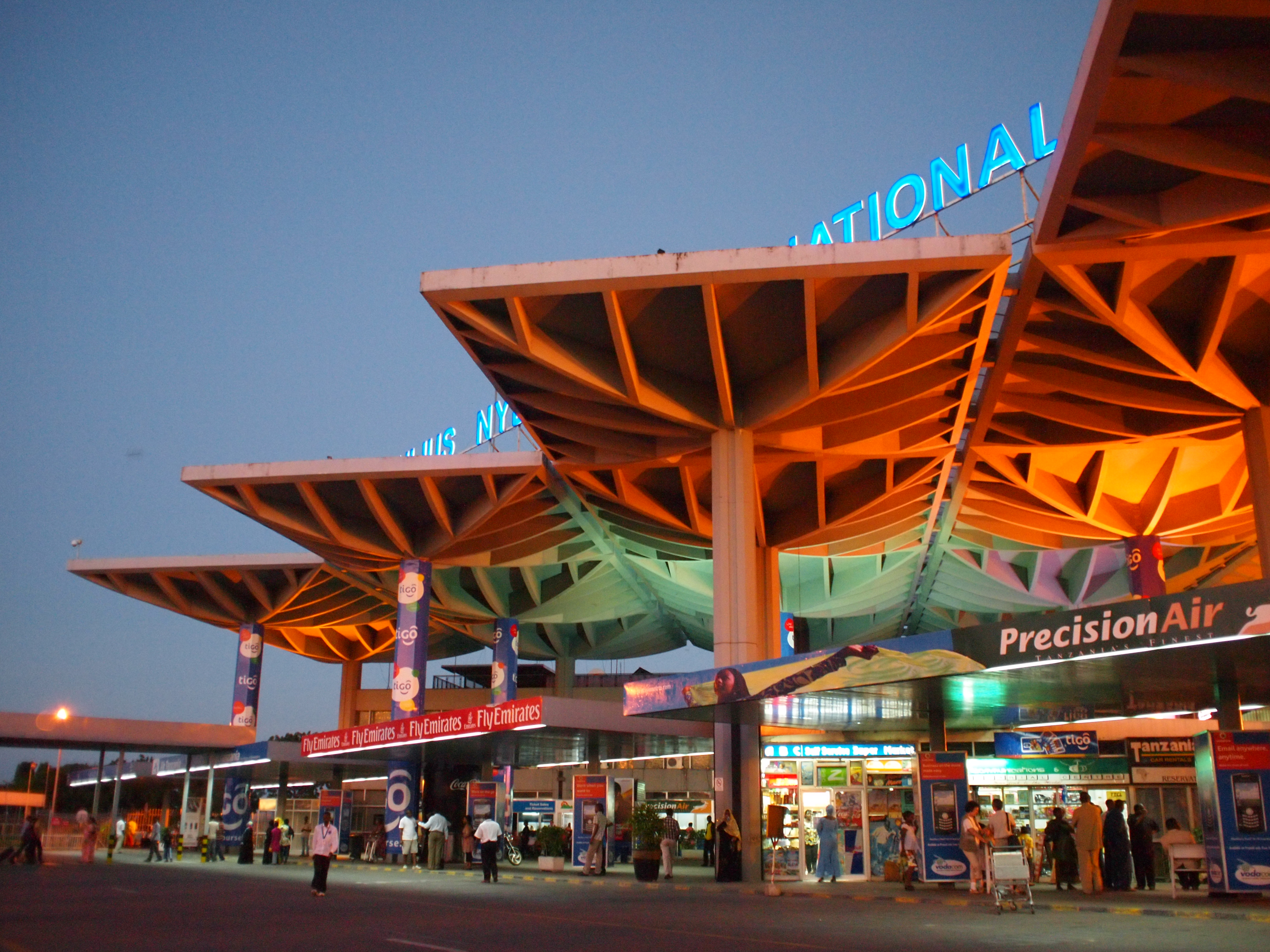
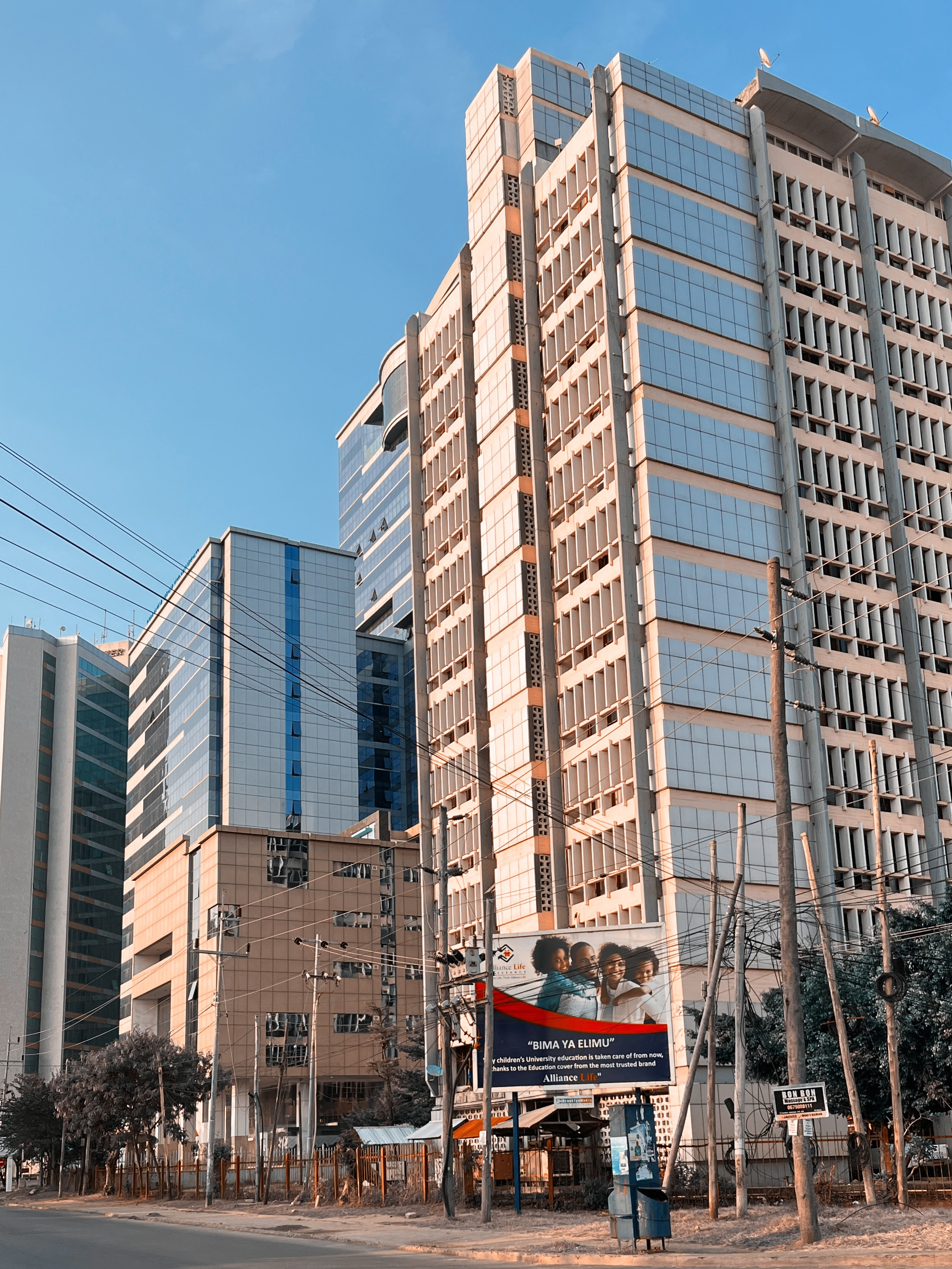
- From top to bottom: Street scene in Ilala, Julius Nyerere International Airport & High rises on Ohio Street in Ilala
- Nickname: The leading district
- Ilala District in Dar
- Coordinates: 6°55′39.36″S 39°8′0.96″E
- Country: Tanzania
- Region: Dar es Salaam Region
- District: 1 February 2001
- Capital: Mchafukoge

Area
  - Total: 364.9 km^{2} (140.9 sq mi)
  - Rank: 2nd in Dar
- Highest elevation (Nzasa,Chanika): 250 m (820 ft)

Population (2022 census)
  - Total: 1,649,912
  - Rank: 1st in Dar
  - Density: 4,522/km^{2} (11,710/sq mi)
- Demonym: Ilalan

Ethnic groups
  - Settler: Swahili
  - Native: Zaramo
- Time zone: UTC+3 (EAT)
- Tanzanian Postcode: 121
- Website: Official website
- Symbols of Tanzania
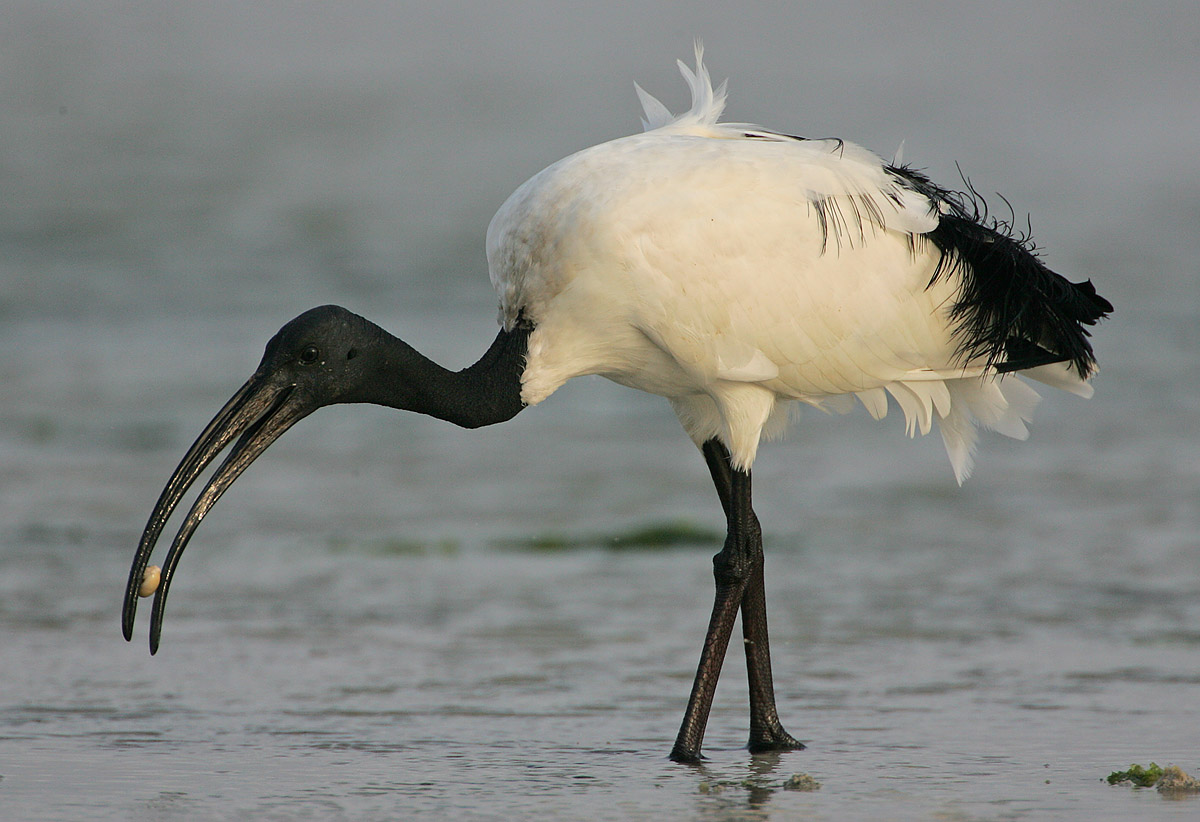
- Bird: Sacred ibis

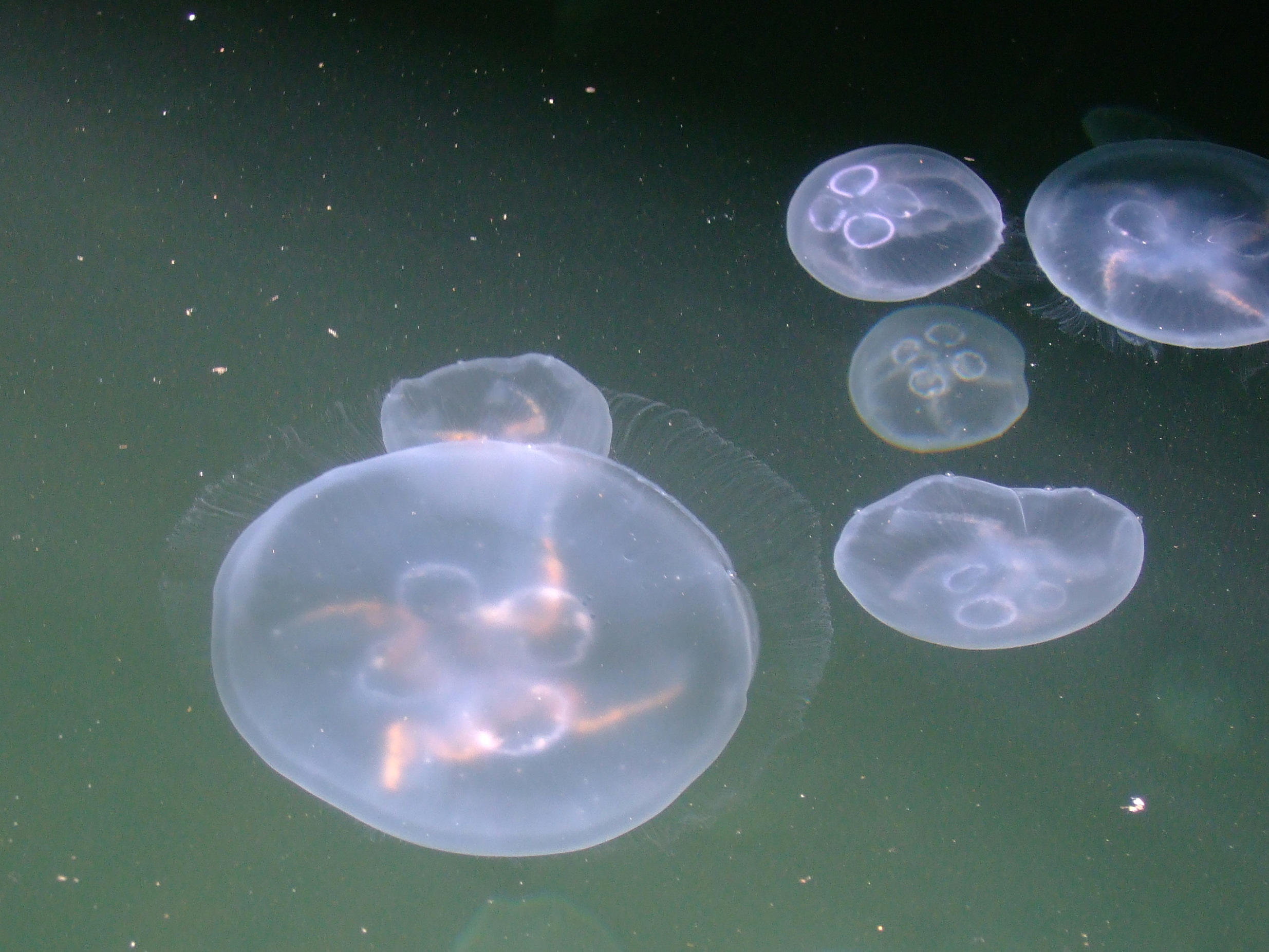
- Fish: Moon jellyfish

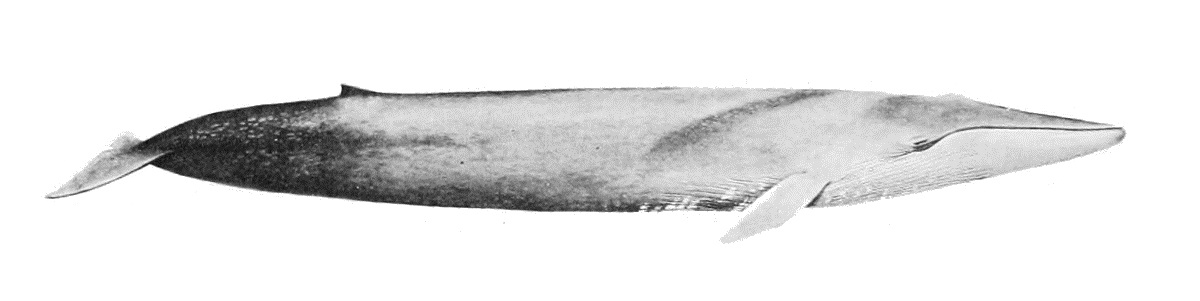
- Mammal: Blue whale

Ilala District, officially the Ilala Municipal Council (Halimashauri ya Manispaaa ya Ilala, in Swahili) is one of five districts of the Dar es Salaam Region of Tanzania. The district is bordered to the north and northeast by Kinondoni District and Ubungo District, to the east by the Zanzibar Channel, the west by Pwani Region, and to the south by the Temeke District. It covers an area of 364.9 km^{2} (140.9 sq mi). The district is comparable in size to the land area of U.S Virgin Islands. The administrative seat is Mchafukoge. The 2022 National Tanzania Census states the population for Ilala as 1,649,912.

== Administration ==
Ilala Municipal Council was one of the first 38 Local Government Authorities to undergo restructuring as part of phase one of the Local Government Reform Programme (LGRP) in order to meet the qualities required by the Local Government Act No. 6 of 1999, which aims to devolve political, legal, administrative, and financial powers to local authorities. Ilala Municipal Council was established in 1992, following a decade of poor performance by the old Dar es Salaam City Council, which caused the government to organize a probe team that produced the Mulokozi Report. Following this analysis, the government decided to reform Dar es Salaam's local government system in 1993.

In 1996, the government disbanded the City Council and established the Dar es Salaam City Commission as an interim administration with the broad mandates of the three restructuring programs. One of the programs was the formation of three new municipal councils, namely Ilala, Temeke, and Kinondoni, with the goal of responding to local demands and conditions for the best service delivery. Thus, on February 1, 2001, the Ilala Municipal Council (together with the citywide authority and the other two municipalities) was formally constituted.

Ilala Municipal Council is organized into three administrative divisions: Ilala, Ukonga, and Kariakoo. The district is also divided into wards (kata), which are further subdivided into neighbourhoods (mitaa). There are 36 wards and 159 neighbourhoods in the Municipal Council.

The wards are listed below:

- Bonyokwa
- Buguruni
- Buyuni
- Chanika
- Gerezani
- Gongolamboto
- Ilala
- Jangwani
- Liwiti
- Kariakoo
- Kimanga
- Kinyerezi
- Kipawa
- Kipunguni
- Kisukuru
- Kitunda
- Kisutu
- Kivukoni
- Kivule
- Kiwalani
- Majohe
- Mchafukoge
- Mchikichini
- Minazi Mirefu
- Mnyamani
- Msongola
- Mzinga
- Pugu
- Pugu Station
- Segerea
- Tabata
- Ukonga
- Upanga East
- Upanga West
- Vingunguti
- Zingiziwa

== Geography ==
=== Climate ===
Temperatures in the municipality range from 26 degrees Celsius in August to 35 degrees Celsius in December and January. During the long rainy season (March - May), the average monthly rainfall is 150 mm - 300 mm. The rainy season lasts from October through December, with monthly average rainfall ranging from 75 mm to 100 mm. The altitude of Ilala Municipality, which spans between 0 and 900 meters above sea level, has an impact on the municipality's biological characteristics. As a result, the Municipality is made up of a huge lowland area and a tiny upland zone.

The lowland areas run from the Municipality's Indian Ocean border (Kivukoni ward) to Segerea, Ukonga, and Kitunda wards. Beyond these wards, the minor upland sections of Pugu, Kinyerezi, Chanika, and Msongola wards emerge as small hills or plateaus. Whereas the majority of the Municipality's lowland sections are urban, the upland districts are largely agricultural and peri-urban in nature. The soil in these places is made up of sand, clay, and loam.

== Economy ==
Ilala's main economic activities include retailing businesses such as small and medium-sized shops, hotels, bars, and restaurants, transportation services, clearing and forwarding, agro businesses, medical businesses, handcraft businesses, banking businesses, and construction businesses. These activities employ around 45% of Ilala Municipality's total population.

=== Infrastructure ===
The municipal road network is 1215.66 km long. The road network is made up of 118.34 km of tarmac, 264.81 km of gravel, and 638.22 km of earth roads, accounting for 62.49% of the entire road network in the municipality. There was no information on road surface type per division. However, the majority of the municipal's asphalt roads are found in the Kariakoo division, whereas the Ukonga division is largely covered by earth roads.

The primary mode of public transportation is the dala dala bus. The majority of them are registered and privately owned dala dala in services with a total seating capacity of 25-32 seats. Dar es Salaam's public transportation services are unreliable, uncomfortable, and unsafe. Given the total size of the urban transportation fleet, the maximum daily passenger capacity is predicted to be 4.6 million passenger journeys per day.

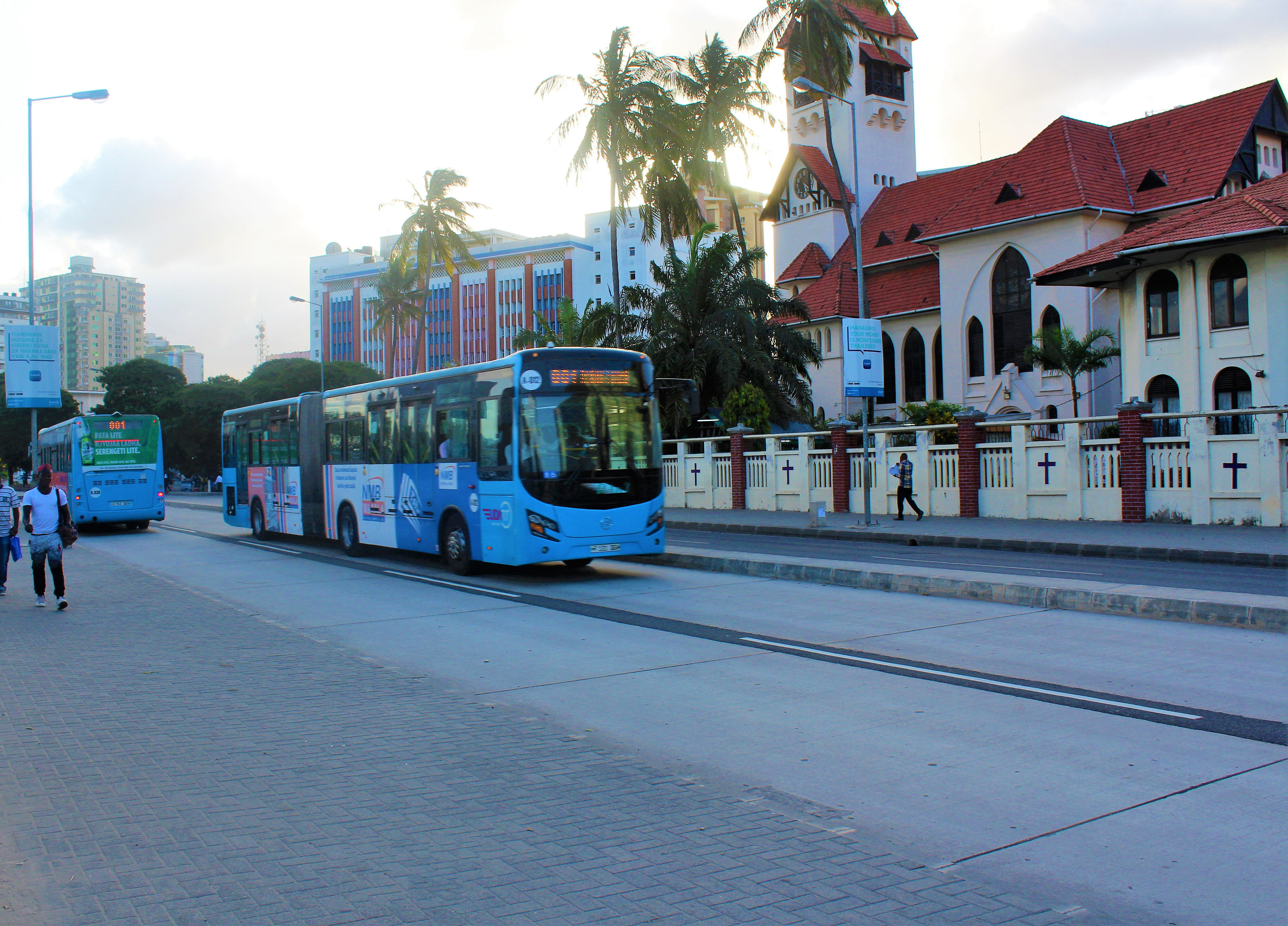
Dar Rapid Transit Buses

Ilala has three major railway services. Tanzania Railways Corporation operates two of these, an older Metre-gauge railway from Dar es Salaam west to cities such as Tabora and Mwanza. The line was originally built during British colonial administration to transport minerals and is now primarily used for freight. A newer, modern, electric Standard-gauge railway is under construction parallel to the old line and is partially operational up to the country's capital Dodoma. TAZARA Railway connects Dar es Salaam with Zambia.

Julius Nyerere International Airport, Tanzania's major international airport is in Ilala as the major entrance for incoming and exiting aviation passengers in the country. Tanzania Airport Authority manages the airport.

=== Agriculture ===
Farming and livestock are another key economic activity in Ilala Municipality, employing 13% of the population. Cattle, goats, sheep, donkeys, pigs, and chickens are among the livestock kept in the municipality. Fishing in the Indian Ocean also employs a significant number of people in the municipality. Cassava, sweet potatoes, paddy, maize, and cowpeas are among the principal food crops farmed. Cassava is the principal food crop in rural areas, where it is cooked fresh or dried for flour production. Sweet potatoes and paddy are two more food crops grown throughout the lengthy rainy season, particularly in waterlogged areas.

The main cash crops farmed in Ilala Municipal Council include a range of vegetables such as amaranthus, Chinese cabbages, egg plants, okra, kale, and leek (matembele), as well as fruits such as citrus, passionate, pawpaws (papaya), pineapples, mangoes, cucumbers, and cashew nuts. Because of the city's vast population, a market for crop produce exists, and crops can be sold in various marketplaces in Kariakoo, Buguruni, Kisutu, and Chanika.

Ilala Municipal Council is home to a variety of established enterprises. Medium-sized industries that process food, beverages, and textiles are among the most important. Others include small-scale industries that dominate a variety of food and textile products. Small-scale industries include hulling and milling machines, as well as fruit processing machines, which add value to agricultural basic products.

=== GDP ===
Dar es Salaam Region offers economic potentials in industrial production and business transactions, with Ilala Municipality being the most important. According to the 2007 Dar es Salaam Regional Profile, the Region contributed around 17% of the country's Gross Domestic Product (GDP) yearly. According to the 2018 Dar es Salaam Regional Profile, the region's income climbed from TZS 17.5 trillion in 2016 to TZS 20.1 trillion in 2017, representing a TZS 2.5 trillion or 12.68% rise. The average yearly per capita income in the Dar es Salaam region increased by 13.4% in 2017 to TZS 4,004,088.70 from TZS 3,227,593.23 in 2016.

=== Tourism ===
The National Museum is the main attraction in the Ilala district. The British constructed it as the King George V Memorial Museum in 1940. In 1963, new structures that are now part of the museum were built by Nyerere's government. The museum houses Tanzanian historical documents, marine biology, and ethnography. The museum also houses the skull of Australopithecus Boisei, which was discovered in 1959 in Olduvai Gorge by the late Dr. Leakey. There is also the Makumbusho Village, which is part of the national museum and deals with many traditional Tanzanian ethnic heritage such as culture, dances, housing, as well as other tangible qualities. The District has one forest reserve, the Zingiziwa Mangrove Forest Reserve (100.5 ha)

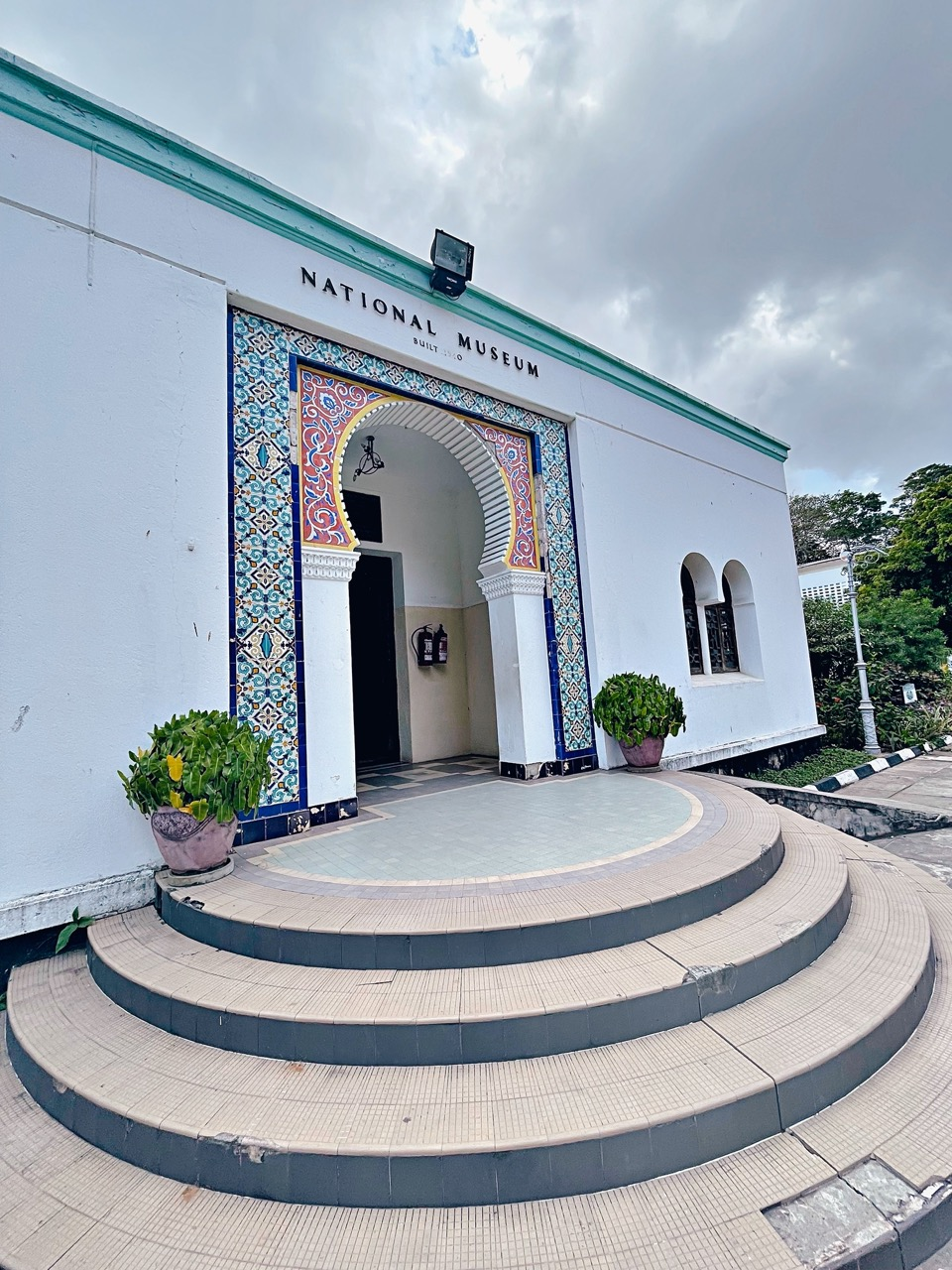
National Museum facade, Kivukoni Ward, Ilala

== Demographics ==
Like most of Dar es Salaam, Ilala is the ancestral home of the Zaramo people and some Ndengereko communities. However, as a result of urbanization, many people from many ethnic backgrounds have emigrated into the municipality, making it tribally diverse. There is no single ethnic group that constitutes more than a quarter of the overall population.

The district has become a cosmopolitan community of people from all over the world. The municipality had a total population of 1,649,912, with 793,731 men and 856,181 females, for a sex ratio of 93. Majohe ward had the largest population of 115,118 people, while Kivukoni ward had the smallest number of 4,045 people. Females continue to outnumber males in almost all wards, with the exception of a few wards such as Mchikichini, Kariakoo, Jangwani, Gerezani, Mchafukoge, Kivukoni, and Upanga Magharibi. The municipality had 458,614 households, with an average household size of 3.6 people.

Population growth rates in Ilala Municipal Council grew from 4.6% in 2002 to 5.6% in 2012. It could be linked to enhanced municipal health services and a higher level of living. Between 2002 and 2012, the municipality's population density went from an average of 3,022 people per square kilometer to 5,810 persons per square kilometer. Migration into the municipality is another element contributing to the quicker rate of growth. Between 2002 and 2012, the population of Ilala Municipality increased by 92.2%, from 634,924 to 1,220,611. This increase has an impact on the provision of social services to all Ilala Municipality stakeholders. The rise was substantially greater in the Ukonga division, which increased by 475,778 individuals during the two inter-census periods.

According to the 2012 Population and Housing Census, Ilala Municipality had 300,674 households divided into 26 wards, with Vingunguti ward having the most households (28,994 households). Kivukoni ward has the fewest households (1,343 households). This is owing in part to the fact that the majority of the buildings in this region are government offices, with very few residential buildings. According to the 2012 Population and Housing Census, the sex ratio for Ilala Municipality was 95, suggesting that the municipality had more females than males. Kariakoo ward had the highest sex ratio (113), while Kimanga ward had the lowest (90).

== Health and Education ==
=== Health ===
Ilala District has 142 health care facilities. The total number of public privately held dispensaries made for 77.5% of all dispensaries in Ilala Municipality. and only 22.5% were owned by the government. The district has six health centers and one large public hospital. Most common illnesses in the district are upper respiratory infection, malaria, urinary tract infection, hypertension, and non-severe pneumonia were the most commonly reported causes of morbidity for outpatients in 2015 and 2018.

=== Education ===
The municipality contains 237 pre-primary schools, 121 of which are government-run and 116 of which are privately operated. In 2018, the Municipality has 235 primary schools, with 120 being government-run and 115 being privately owned. There are 98 secondary schools in the Municipal Council. There are 51 public schools and 47 private schools among these.In terms of secondary school enrollment, there were 67,652 students enrolled in 2018. Girls made up 52.4% of those enrolled in secondary schools, while boys made up the remaining 47.6%. The Municipal Council is home to nine higher learning institutions, six of which are government-run and three of which are privately held.
