= Fred Mhalu =

Microbiologist

Fred Mhalu is a microbiologist and medical researcher from Tanzania. His main area of study revolves around infectious diseases and intervention. Ever since 1986, he has been a main contributor to the information about AIDS in Africa. As a co-coordinator of a Tanzanian-Swedish research collaboration called TANSWED, he was involved in many research projects that lead to multiple publications in medical journals. His more recent research on HIV/AIDS involves studying breast cancer in HIV prevalent areas, evaluating prevention of mother-to-child-transmission of HIV-1, and observing sexual behaviors of high risk populations for HIV-1.

== Education ==
Mhalu trained in medicine at Makerere University College Medical School in Kampala, Uganda. He continued training pathology, microbiology, and immunology at various universities, including the University of Ibadan Nigeria, the London School of Hygiene and Tropical Medicine, and the Royal Postgraduate Medical School at London University. In 2003, Mhalu was awarded an honorary Doctorate at Karolinska Institute in Sweden.

== Career ==
=== Early career ===
Mhalu was a professor at the Department of Microbiology and Immunology, a Dean of the School of Medicine, and the Director of Postgraduate Studies and Research at Muhimbili University College of Health Sciences (MUCHS) in Dar Es Salaam, Tanzania. Before working on AIDS, Mhalu largely focused his studies on communicable diseases and intervention tactics. He was the lead researcher on Tanzania's cholera outbreak. In 1986, his career path shifted and he started researching AIDS prevalence among barmaids in Dar Es Salaam, which had similar trends of transmission to cases in Uganda. Mhalu was a co-coordinator for TANSWED, an HIV/AIDS research program, with Professor Gunnel Biberfeld from Sweden since 1986. He was also a coordinator for a multicenter study in Tanzania for the Prevention of Mother-to-Child HIV transmission (PMTCT) program from 1996 to 1999. Mhalu served as another coordinator for an intervention project called Mother-to-Infant HIV transmission in Tanzania.

In 1986, Mhalu was sent to Congo to investigate an emerging drug, and was found to be very skeptical of its effectiveness. He claimed that effective treatment comes from scientific approaches that studies the molecular biology and biochemistry of the HIV virus, and not spontaneous trials without the usage of scientific principles.

=== Recent career ===
In 2000, Mhalu was invited by the president of South Africa, Thabo Mbeki, to be a part of a panel in the 2000 International AIDS Conference. The purpose of this conference was to bring together many scientists and experts from all over the world to debate the pathology of AIDS. President Thabo Mbeki questioned the relationship that AIDS is caused by the HIV virus, and instead believed it was caused by poverty and side effects from Western pharmaceuticals. Through this conference, Thabo Mbeki wanted to get answers from questions, like the pathology of AIDS and prevention, to assist with governmental responses to the epidemic. Mhalu did not attend the conference in Durban, South Africa. In response to this stance by the president of South Africa, five-thousand scientists, including Mhalu, published the Durban Declaration. These scientists were anxious that AIDS denialism presented by Thabo Mbeki would contribute to more AIDS cases and deaths in HIV-prevalence countries, since prevention strategies like condom usage and blood screening would not be encouraged. Mhalu was a contributor to the Durban Declaration Organizing Committee, but he did not sign the declaration.

In 2004, Mhalu co-signed a letter in support for vaccine trials of the RV144 HIV vaccine. This phase III clinical trial in Thailand immunized three-thousand volunteers and tests immune responses at the cellular level. The trial is sponsored by Thai and United States government, and has received some criticism by Dennis Burton and colleagues. Mhalu recognized benefit from this clinical trial because of its contribution to gain knowledge on HIV vaccination development.

Mhalu's most recent published work has been focused on the molecular epidemiology of HIV, vaccine trials among police officers in Tanzania, and HIV infection transmitted through breast milk.

== TANSWED ==
Started in 1986 by collaboration of Mhalu and Biberfeld, TANSWED, a Tanzanian and Swedish HIV/AIDS program, is a bilateral project aimed at collecting information about HIV infections in Tanzania. In 1987, this program launched a research project in Kagera Region called KARP (Kagera AIDS Research Project) to study HIV prevalence in blood samples among adults. Not too soon after this first project, TANSWED expanded their research areas outside of Kagera due to their growing numbers of researchers involved in the program. The main goals of TANSWED included advancing knowledge on the epidemiology and immunopathology of AIDS, studying behaviors that increased the risk of infection, and analyzing less expensive diagnostic techniques. TANSWED has supported the research of many Tanzanian scientists, including Japhet Killewo

As a co-coordinator of the program, Mhalu made large contributions to many projects within TANSWED, as well participating in meetings to evaluate and improve the program overall. In 1988, Mhalu attended the 3rd International Conference on AIDS in Africa in Arusha, Tanzania and served as a chair member. Mhalu supervised the eight subprograms initiated through TANSWED, which included, but is not limited to, improving the diagnosis of HIV-1, studying mother-to-child transmission of HIV-1, and evaluating HIV-1 vaccine preparations. Some projects that Mhalu took part in include the research of improving HIV-1 laboratory diagnosis, preparation for HIV-1 vaccine evaluations in Tanzania, and studies that focused on young people and STDs in comparison with HIV.

Some scientific articles that Mhalu has published through TANSWED include a comparison study of HIV prevalence in controls and patients, a case definition explanation of AIDS, and a population-based study of HIV prevalence in the Kagera region.

== Selected works and publications ==
- HIV/AIDS, a publication explaining pathology, prevention, and infection of AIDS.
- Acceptability of voluntary HIV testing with counseling in a rural village in Kagera, Tanzania, a pilot study.
- Alternative confirmatory strategies in HIV-1 antibody testing.
- Clinical case definition of AIDS in African adults.
- Decline in the prevalence of HIV-1 infection in young women in the Kagera region of Tanzania.
- Late postnatal transmission of human immunodeficiency virus type 1 infection from mothers to infants in Dar Es Salaam.

== See also ==
- HIV/AIDS
- HIV/AIDS in Africa
