= Mloganzila Hospital =

Mloganzila Hospital Hospitali ya Taifa Muhimbili–Mloganzila (Swahili)
- Muhimbili National Hospital
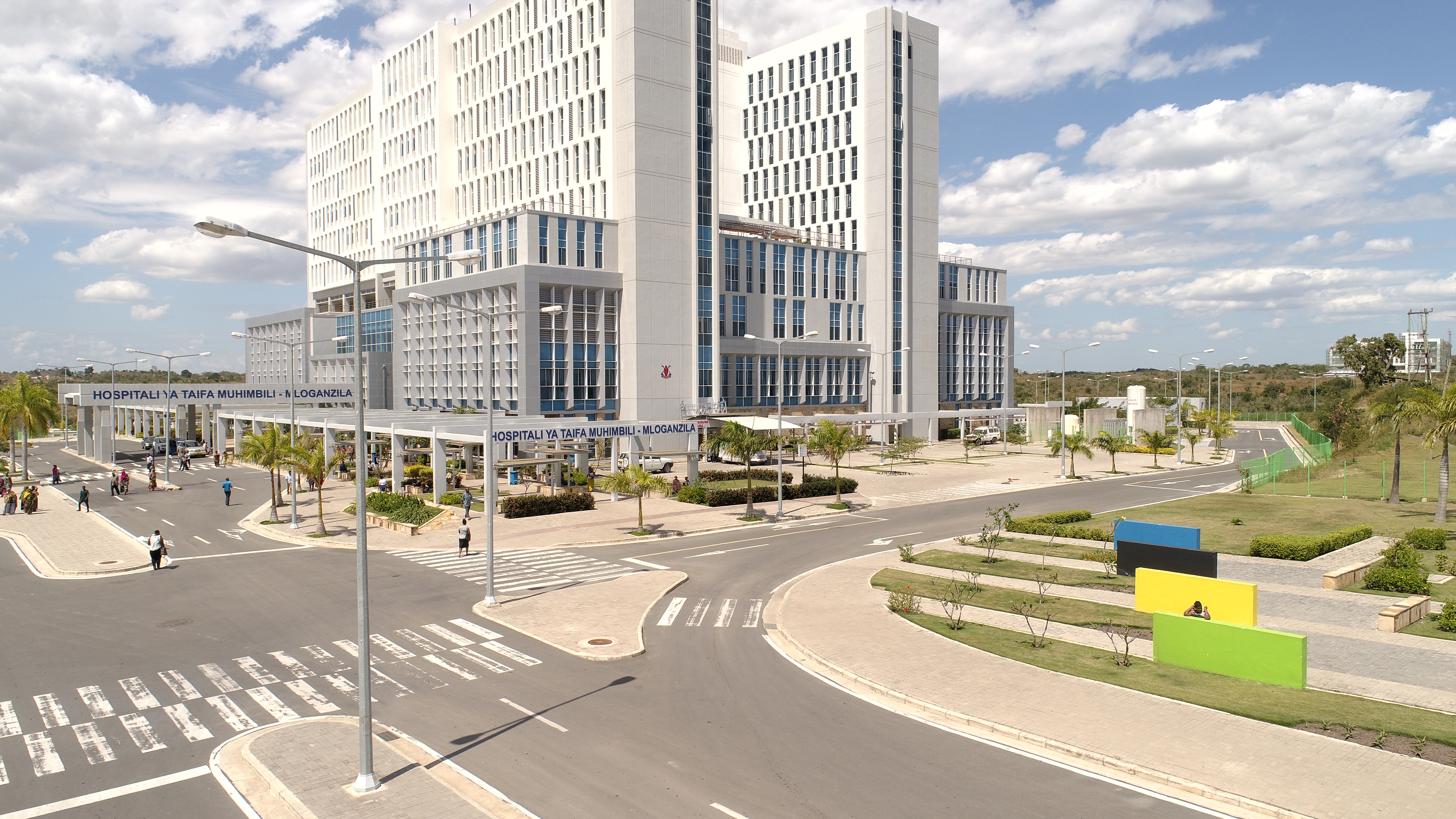
- Hospital building in 2019

Geography
- Location: Dar es Salaam, Tanzania
- Coordinates: 6.815°S 39.0587°E

Organisation
- Funding: Public hospital
- Type: Teaching Hospital
- Affiliated university: Muhimbili University

Services
- Beds: 608

History
- Former name: Muhimbili Academic Medical Centre (MAMC)
- Opened: 2017

Links
- Website: www.mloganzila.or.tz

The Muhimbili National Hospital–Mloganzila (MNH–Mloganzila) is a teaching hospital in Dar es Salaam, Tanzania.

== History ==
Government of South Korea provided a soft loan for the construction. The project cost $98.5 million.

== Expansion ==
The Jakaya Kikwete Cardiac Institute plans to build a 280-bed facility at Mloganzila.
