= Festo Dugange =

Tanzanian politician

Honorable Festo John Dugange MP

Deputy Minister President's Office Public Service Management and Good Governance
- Incumbent
- Assumed office December 2020
- President: John Magufuli (2020-2021); Samia Suluhu (2021-

Member of Parliament
- Incumbent
- Assumed office November 2020
- Constituency: Wanging'ombe

Personal details
- Born: Festo John Dugange; 5 February 1977 (age 48); Wanging'ombe, Njombe Region, Tanzania
- Political party: Chama Cha Mapinduzi
- Education: Tosamaganga School; Mzumbe High School
- Alma mater: Muhimbili University of Health and Allied Sciences; Open University of Tanzania
- Occupation: Civil Servant
- Profession: Medical doctor

Festo Dugange, also known as Festo John Dugange, is a Tanzanian politician. He serves as Deputy Minister, President's office public service management and good governance. He is the Chama Cha Mapinduzi member of parliament for Wanging'ombe constituency to which he was elected in 2020.
