= South Africa–Tanzania relations =

Bilateral relations between South Africa and Tanzania

- South Africa: Tanzania

Diplomatic mission
- High Commission of South Africa, Dar es Salaam: High Commission of Tanzania, Pretoria

South Africa–Tanzania relations are bilateral relations between South Africa and Tanzania. Both countries are members of the African Union, Southern African Development Community and Commonwealth of Nations.

== History ==
=== Apartheid ===
Tanzania played a big role in South Africa's liberation struggle from the apartheid South African Government. Along with various other regional parties, Tanzania offered itself as a base for those fighting the apartheid government, hosting the forces such as the African National Congress and the Pan African Congress. During the struggle, Tanzania lobbied the international community in Africa and around the world to maintain hard sanctions towards South Africa.

=== Post-apartheid ===
Tanzania established official diplomatic relations with South Africa Immediately after the end of apartheid in 1994. In 2006, South African President Thabo Mbeki and Tanzanian President Jakaya Kikwete made an agreement to abolish visa requirements between both countries. Starting 1 November, 2010 South Africa decided to waive visas for Tanzanian visitors.

== Economic relations ==
South Africa has been one of Tanzania's top trading partners after establishing diplomatic relations in 1994.

=== Foreign-direct investment ===
South Africa is one of the top contributors of foreign direct investment in Tanzania and in 2023 attributed to about 10% of the total investment in the country. Between 1997 and 2022 about 223 South African companies have invested in approximately US$800 million in Tanzania. These investments range in all industries such as mining, manufacturing, retail, telecommunication, finance etc.

=== Trade balance ===
South Africa has a strong positive trade balance against Tanzania. The main import from Tanzania include agricultural products and precious metals, while the mail exports to Tanzania range from various manufactured goods, chemicals and machinery. The following table outlines the trade balance in South African rand between the two countries as per the South African Revenue Service:

	2022	2021	2020	2019	2018	2017	2016	2015	2014	2013	2012	2011	2010
Exports from South Africa	R 8.8b	R 6.4b	R 5.5b	R 6.9b	R 5.8b	R 6.0b	R 6.5b	R 6.7b	R 5.3b	R 5.0b	R 5.0b	R 4.1b	R 4.0b
Imports to South Africa	R 0.8b	R 0.4b	R 0.5b	R 0.4b	R 0.4b	R 0.4b	R 0.3b	R 0.4b	R 0.5b	R 1.0b	R 0.5b	R 0.6b	R 0.4b
Total Trade	R 9.6b	R 6.9b	R 5.9b	R 7.3b	R 6.3b	R 6.4b	R 6.9b	R 7.0b	R 5.9b	R 6.0b	R 5.5b	R 4.7b	R 4.5b
Notes													

== High level visits ==
=== Presidential ===
- 31 May 2015, Jacob Zuma visits Tanzania on a state visit.
- 26 October 2015, Jakaya Kikwete visits South Africa on a state visit.
- 25 May 2019, John Magufuli visits South Africa for Cyril Ramaphosa's inauguration.
- 15 March 2023, Samia Suluhu Hassan visits South Africa on a state visit.

== Diplomatic missions ==
- Tanzania has a high commission in Pretoria.
- South Africa has a high commission in Dar es Salaam.

=== High Commissioners of Tanzania to South Africa ===
- Ami Ramadhan Mpungwe (1994–1999)
- Emmanuel Mwambulukutu (2002–2009)
- Radhia N.M. Msuya (2010–2016)
- Sylvester Mwakinyuke Sangalala Ambokile (2017–2019)
- Maj Gen Gaudence Salim Milanzi (September 2019–Present)

== See also ==
- Foreign relations of South Africa
- Foreign relations of Tanzania
