= Upanga East =

Ward of Ilala District, Dar es Salaam Region

Upanga East Kata ya Upanga Mashariki (Swahili)
- Ward of Ilala District
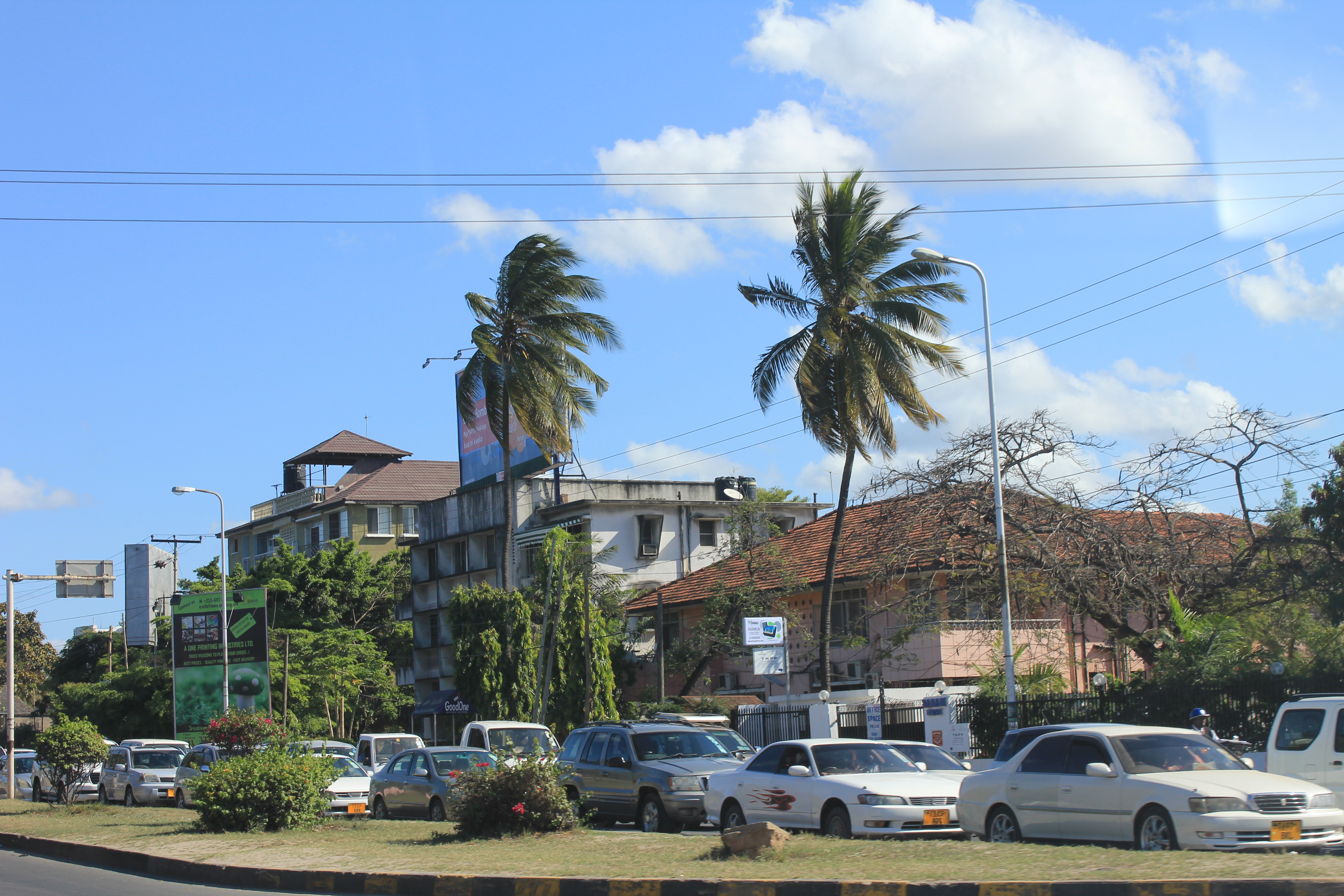
- From top to bottom: Road nest to Upanga East ward
- Interactive map of Upanga East
- Coordinates: 6°48′17.28″S 39°16′52.32″E
- Country: Tanzania
- Region: Dar es Salaam Region
- District: Ilala District

Area
  - Total: 1.4 km^{2} (0.54 sq mi)

Population (2022)
  - Total: 9,317

Ethnic groups
  - Settler: Swahili & Indians
  - Ancestral: Zaramo
- Tanzanian Postal Code: 11102

Upanga East (Kata ya Upanga Mashariki, in Swahili) is an administrative ward of the Ilala Municipical Council of the Dar es Salaam Region in Tanzania. Kivukoni forms the ward's northern boundary. Kisutu borders the ward to the east, and Mchafukoge and Jangwani border it to the south. By Upanga West, to the west. The ward is home to the Tanzanian National Library. According to the 2022 census, the ward has a total population of 9,317.

== Administration ==
The postal code for the Upanga East ward is 11102. The ward is divided into the following neighborhoods (Mitaa):

- Kibasila
- Kitonga, Upanga East

=== Government ===
The ward, like every other ward in the country, has local government offices based on the population served.The Upanga East Ward administration building houses a court as per the Ward Tribunal Act of 1988, including other vital departments for the administration of the ward. The ward has the following administration offices:

- Upanga Mashariki Police Station
- Upanga Mashariki Government Office (Afisa Mtendaji)
- Upanga Mashariki Tribunal (Baraza La Kata) is a Department inside Ward Government Office

In the local government system of Tanzania, the ward is the smallest democratic unit. Each ward is composed of a committee of eight elected council members which include a chairperson, one salaried officer (with no voting rights), and an executive officer. One-third of seats are reserved for women councillors.

== Demographics ==
The ward serves as the Zaramo people's ancestral home, along with much of the district. As the city developed throughout time, the ward became a cosmopolitan ward. In fact the ward together with Upanga West has the largest concentration of Indian immigrants in the country. In total, 9,317 people called the ward home in 2022.

== Education and health ==
=== Education ===
The ward is home to these educational institutions

- Upanga Primary School
- Zanaki Primary School
- Bryceson Primary School
- Aga Khan Primary School
- Aga Khan Nursery School
- Al Madrastus Primary School
- Diamond Primary School
- Simba Elementary School
- Olympio Primary School
- Shabaan Robert Secondary School
- Laureate Secondary School
- Aga Khan Mzizima Secondary School
- Zanaki Secondary School
- Mabwe Secondary School

=== Healthcare ===
The ward is home to the following health institutions:

- Regency Hospital
- Tumaini Hospital
- Tiba Healthcare

== Embassies in Upanga East ==
Upanga East hosts the following embassies;

- Embassy of The Democratic Republic of Congo
- Embassy of The Italian Republic
- Embassy of The Republic of Burundi
- Embassy of The Republic of Sudan
- Embassy of The State of Japan

== Organisations in Upanga East ==
Upanga East also hosts the following;

- The Aga Khan Diamond Jubilee Hall
- The Tanzania Scouts Association Ground
- The Don Bosco Youth Centre
- The Tanzania Telecommunication Company Limited
