= Jakaya Kikwete Cardiac Institute =

Jakaya Kikwete Cardiac Institute Taasisi ya Moyo Jakaya Kikwete (Swahili)

Geography
- Location: Dar es Salaam, Tanzania
- Coordinates: 6.8034°S 39.27381°E

Organisation
- Funding: Public hospital
- Type: Specialist

Services
- Beds: 157
- Speciality: Cardiovascular

History
- Opened: 15 September 2015

Links
- Website: www.jkci.or.tz

The Jakaya Kikwete Cardiac Institute (JKCI) is a public national specialized cardiovascular teaching and research hospital in Dar es Salaam, Tanzania. It is located within the Muhimbili National Hospital in Upanga West ward of Ilala District. It caters to both paediatric and adult populations with patients referred from across the country. Services offered include diagnostics and imaging, as well as interventional cardiology procedures and cardiothoracic surgery.

Plans are underway to construct an extension of the hospital at the national hospital's campus in Mloganzila outside the city center; this will be a larger facility than the current one.
