= Kisutu =

Ward of Ilala District, Dar es Salaam Region

Kisutu Kata ya Kisutu (Swahili)
- Ward of Ilala District
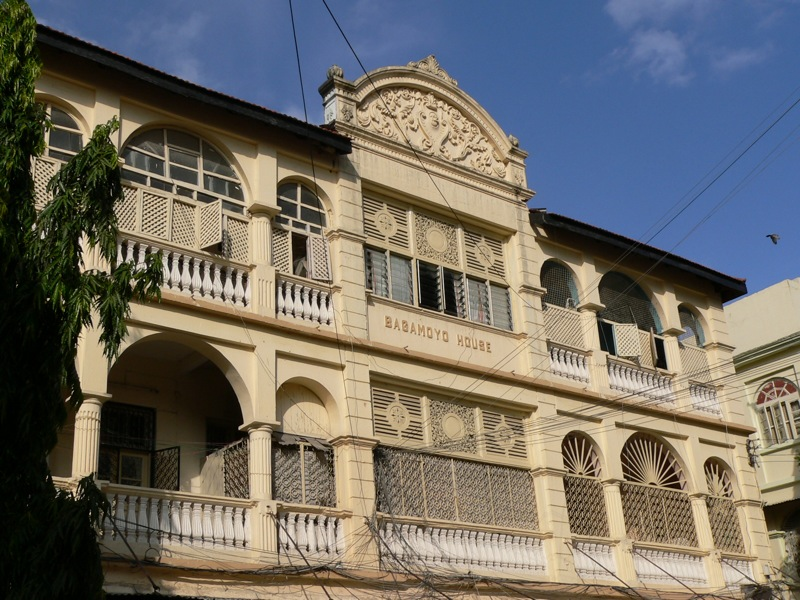
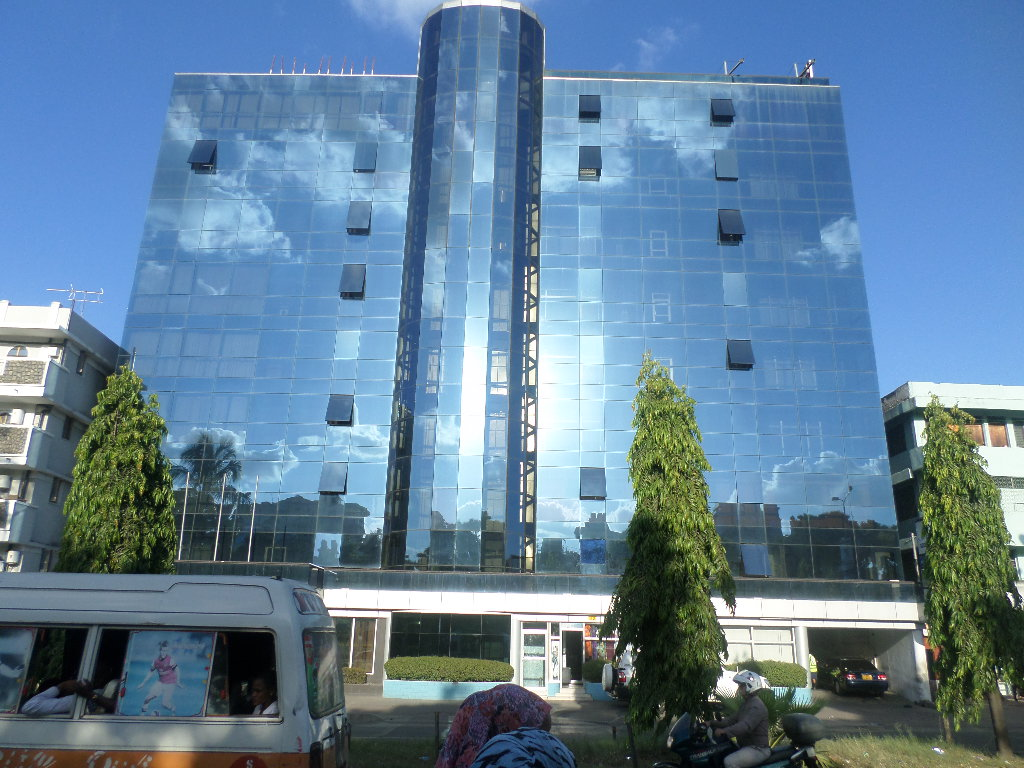
- From top to bottom: Bagamoyo House in Kisutu & Peacock Hotel in Kisutu ward
- Nickname: The believing ward
- Interactive map of Kisutu
- Coordinates: 6°49′0.84″S 39°17′8.16″E
- Country: Tanzania
- Region: Dar es Salaam Region
- District: Ilala District

Area
  - Total: 0.4 km^{2} (0.15 sq mi)

Population (2022)
  - Total: 6,364

Ethnic groups
  - Settler: Swahili & Tanzanian Indians
  - Ancestral: Zaramo
- Tanzanian Postal Code: 11104

Kisutu (Kata ya Kisutu, in Swahili) is an administrative ward of the Ilala Municipal Council of the Dar es Salaam Region in Tanzania. Upanga East ward and Kivukoni ward both border the ward to the north and north-east. The ward is bordered to the south by Mchafukoge ward and to the west by Jangwani ward. The ward hosted the Channel 10 Television Station formerly known as Dar es Salaam Television Station at Zaramo Street in Kisutu ward. In 2022, the population of the ward was 6,364.

== Administration ==
The postal code for the Kisutu ward is 11104. The ward is divided into the following neighborhoods (Mitaa):

- Kisutu, Kisutu
- Mtendeni

=== Government ===
The ward, like every other ward in the country, has local government offices based on the population served.The Kisutu Ward administration building houses a court as per the Ward Tribunal Act of 1988, including other vital departments for the administration the ward. The ward has the following administration offices:

- Kisutu Ward Police Station located in Karume neighborhood
- Kisutu Ward Government Office (Afisa Mtendaji) in Shariff Shamba Neighborhood
- Kisutu Ward Tribunal (Baraza La Kata) is a Department inside Ward Government Office

In the local government system of Tanzania, the ward is the smallest democratic unit. Each ward is composed of a committee of eight elected council members which include a chairperson, one salaried officer (with no voting rights), and an executive officer. One-third of seats are reserved for women councillors.

== Demographics ==
The ward serves as the Zaramo people's ancestral home, along with much of the district. As the city developed throughout time, the ward became into a cosmopolitan ward. In total, 6,364 people called the ward home in 2022.

== Education and health ==
=== Education ===
The ward is home to these educational institutions

- Mtendeni Primary school
- Kisutu Girls Secondary School

=== Healthcare ===
The ward is home to the following health institutions:

- Mtendeni Dispensary
- RTMR Dispensary
- NHC Dispensary
- Eden Medical Clinic
- Natural health therapies Health Center
- Ebrahim Haji Charitable Health Center
- Care And Cure Hospital
- Regency Specialized Health Center
- Shree Hindu Mandal Hospital and Eye Clinic, Kisutu

== Government offices based in Kisutu ==
1. The Tanzania Registration, Insolvency and Trusteeship Agency
2. The Tanzania Revenue Authority

== Mosques ==
Kisutu is nicknamed the "believing ward" because it has the highest number of mosques per capita in anyward in Ilala, including some of the following mosques:

1. Khoja Shia Ithnasheri Mosque on Indira Gandhi Street.
2. Saifee Masjid on Zanaki Street.
3. Ngazija (Commorian) Mosque on India Street.
4. Sunni Mosque on Mosque Street.
5. Juma Mosque on Kitumbini Street.
6. Al-Rawdha Mosque on Mkunguni Street.
