= Askari Monument =

Military memorial in Dar es Salaam, Tanzania

- Sanamu ya Askari (Swahili)
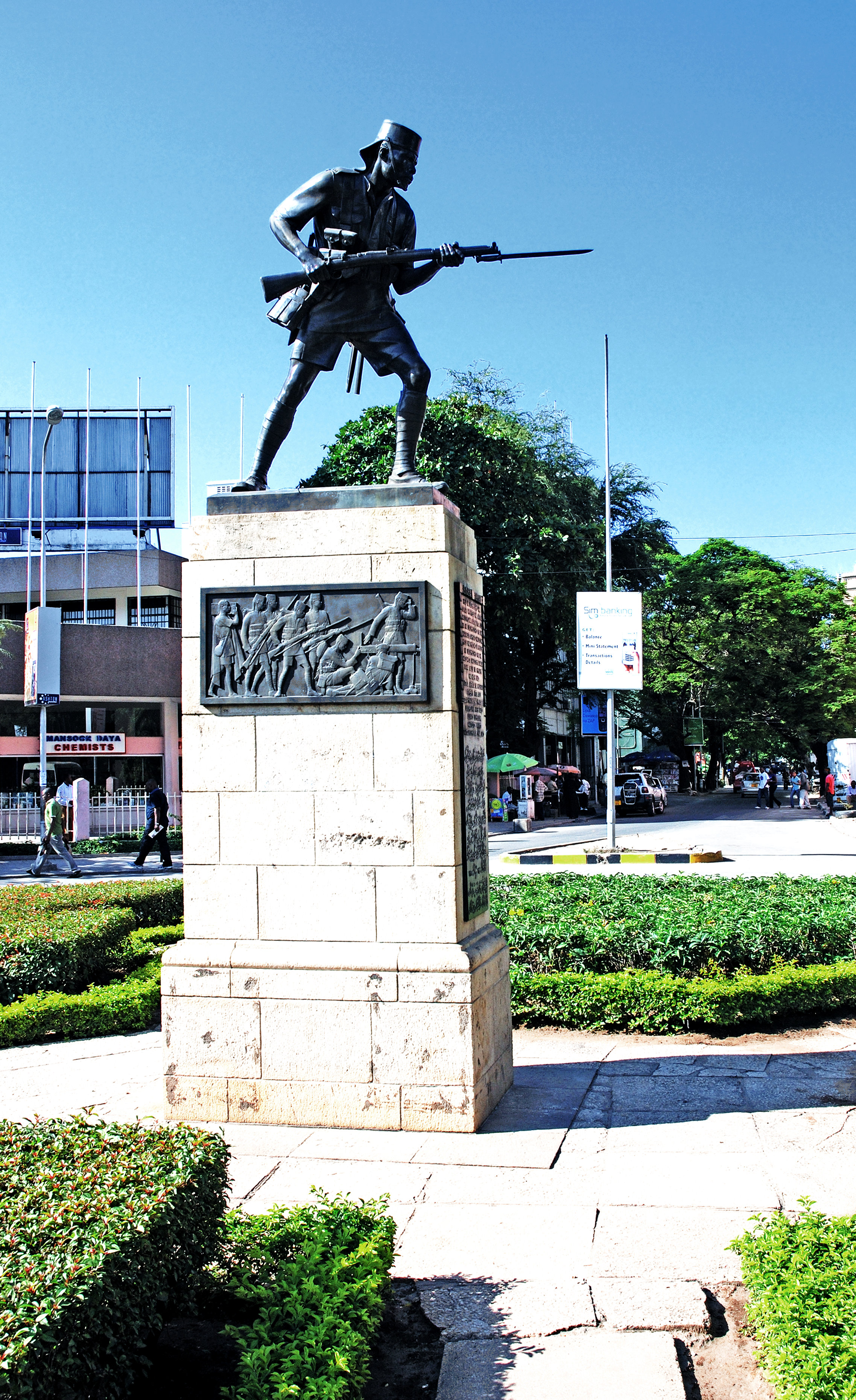
- Interactive map of Askari Monument
- Location: Kivukoni, Ilala, Dar es Salaam, Tanzania
- Coordinates: 6.8166341°S 39.2895626°E
- Designer: James Alexander Stevenson
- Material: Bronze
- Opening date: 1927
- Dedicated to: Tanganyikan askari

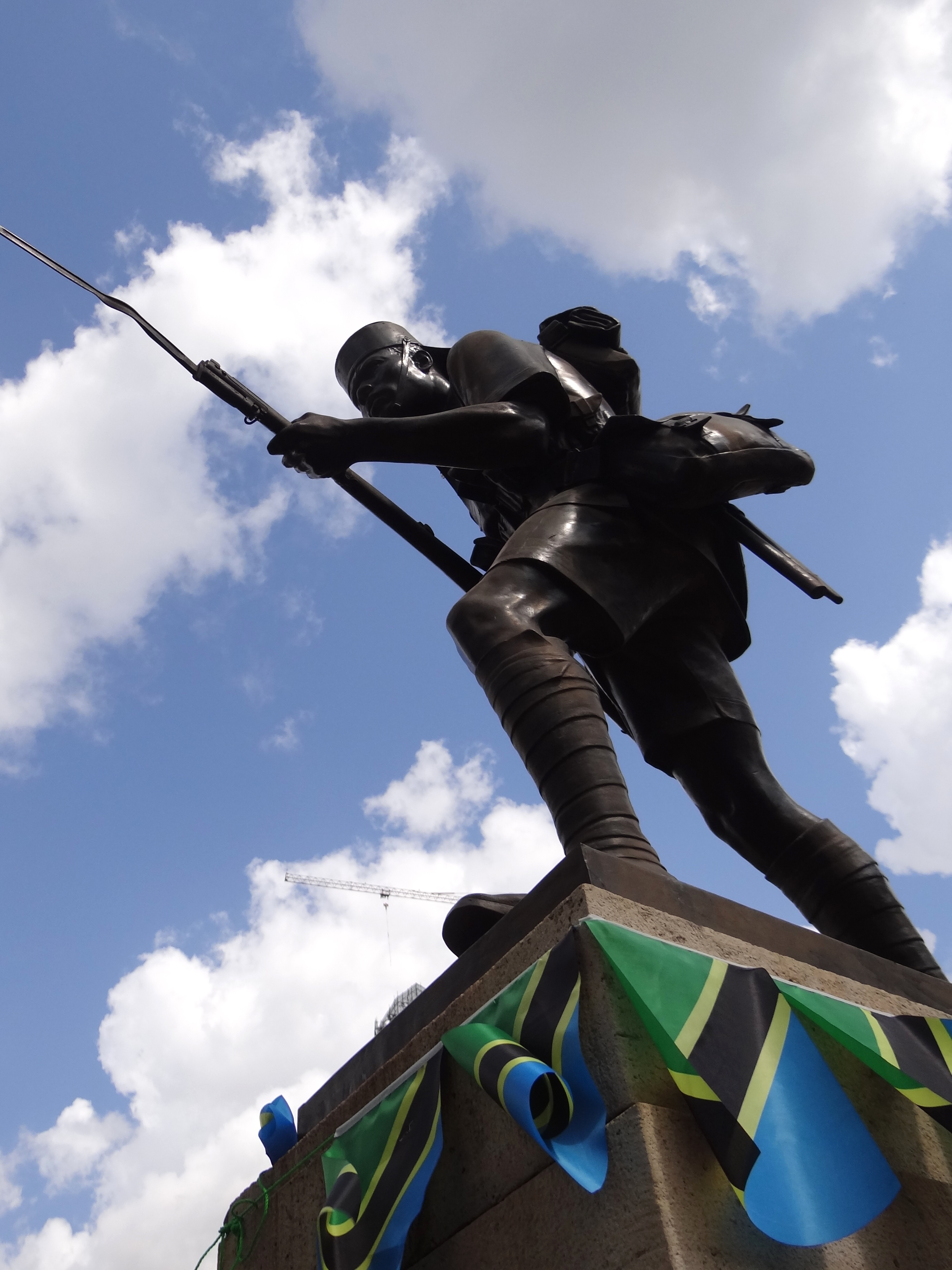
The Askari sculpture

The Askari Monument or Dar es Salaam African Memorial in Kivukoni Ward in Ilala District of Dar es Salaam, Tanzania, is a memorial to the askari (African soldiers) who fought in the British campaign against German forces in East Africa in World War I. It was unveiled in 1927. The monument is located at the centre of a roundabout on Samora Avenue at the perpendicular junction to Maktaba Street and Azikiwe Street, a place that reportedly also marks the exact centre of downtown Dar es Salaam.

The monument was erected in honour of the King's African Rifles and the Carrier Corps. The main feature of the monument is "The Askari", a bronze sculpture of an African soldier. It was realised in the United Kingdom by British sculptor James Alexander Stevenson, who worked for Westminster's Morris Bronze Founders. Stevenson signed the statue with his pseudonym "Myrander". Before being sent to Dar es Salaam, the statue was exhibited at the Royal Academy, receiving critical praise. The soldier has a rifle with bayonet pointed towards the Dar es Salaam harbour. The statue stands on a stone pedestal. On the narrow sides of the pedestal are plaques with a dedication in Swahili (Arabic and Latin script) and English; on the wide sides of the pedestal are two pictorial plaques showing fighting African soldiers and the Carrier Corps. The English inscription includes "If you fight for your country even if you die your sons will remember your name", which is attributed to Rudyard Kipling.

In the place where the Askari Monument is located, there used to be another statue, namely that of German explorer and army major Hermann Wissmann, governor of German East Africa in the late 19th century. The statue of the Wissmann Monument, unveiled in 1911, represented Wissmann standing, one hand on his hip and one on his sword, looking towards the harbour; at his feet, an African soldier covering a dead lion with a German flag. When the British entered Dar es Salaam in 1916, they removed this statue along with those of Karl Peters and Otto von Bismarck.

The monument in Dar es Salaam belongs to a group of three Askari Monuments that were unveiled in the same year in what was then British East Africa; the other two are at Mombasa and Nairobi. A separate Dar es Salaam British and Indian Memorial, commemorating by name more than 1,500 British and Indian officers and men who died in East Africa during and after January 1917 and who have no known grave, is now in Dar es Salaam War Cemetery.

== Gallery ==
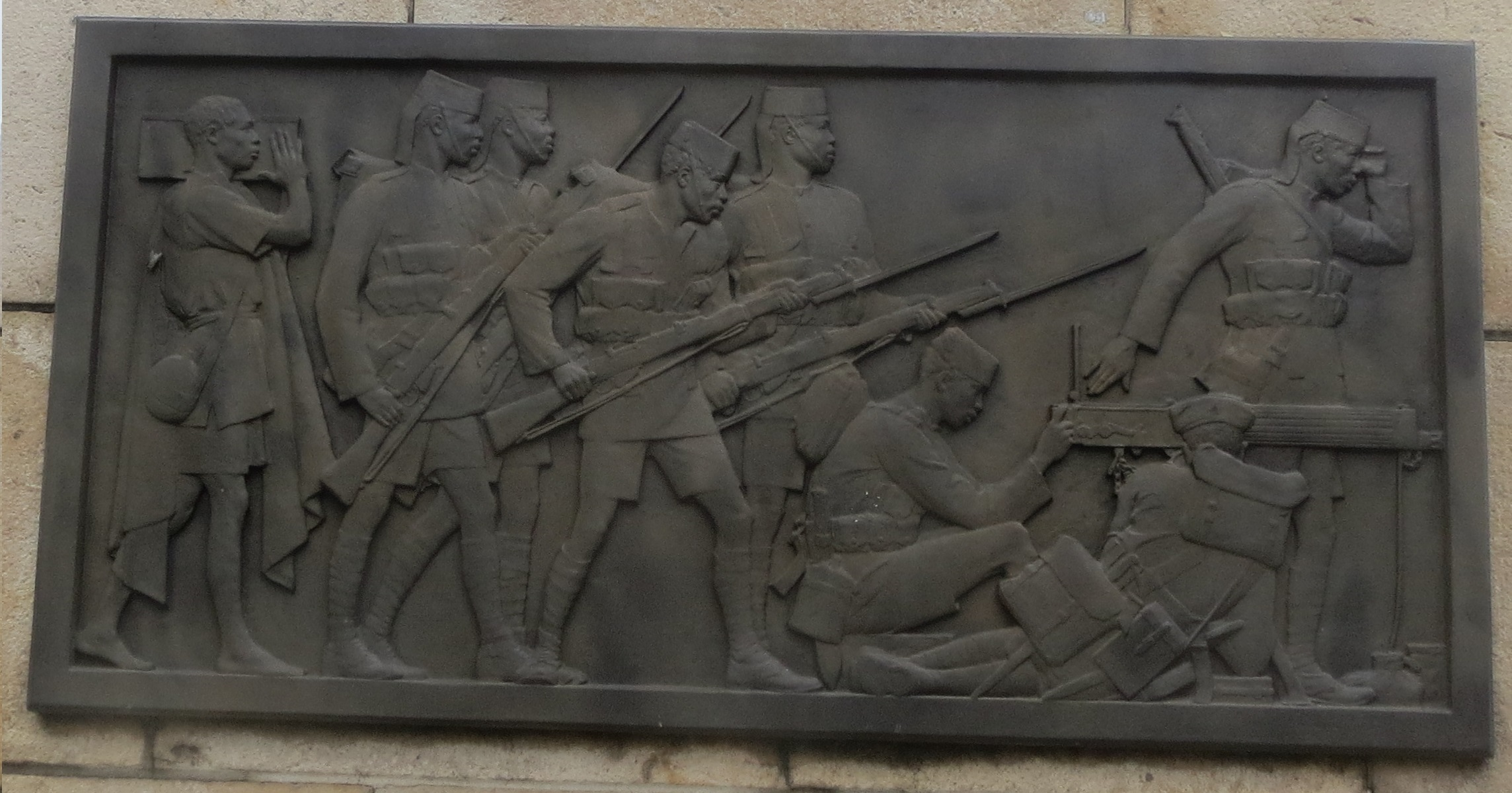
Memorial plaque of eight fighting African soldiers

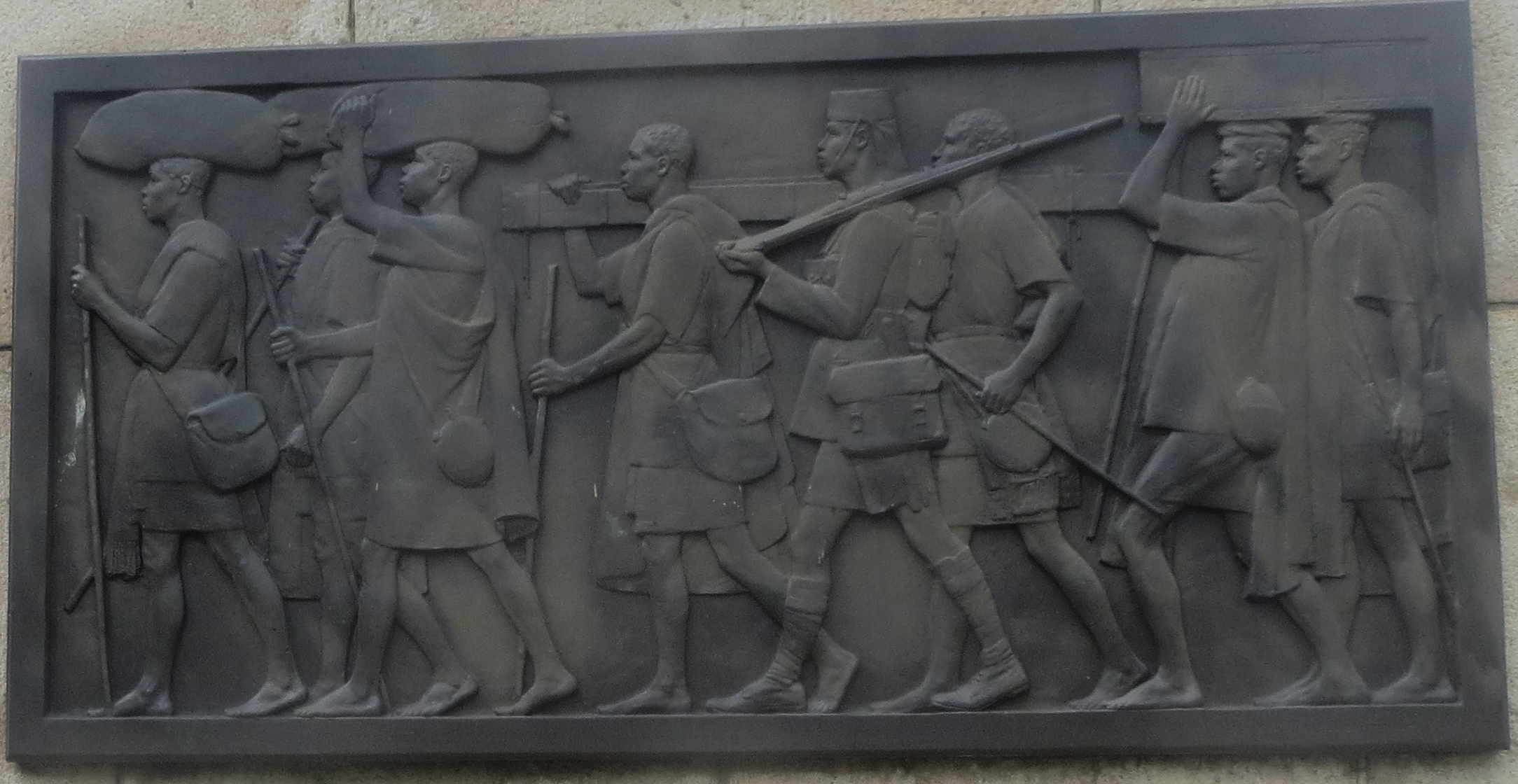
Memorial plaque of eight Carrier Corps

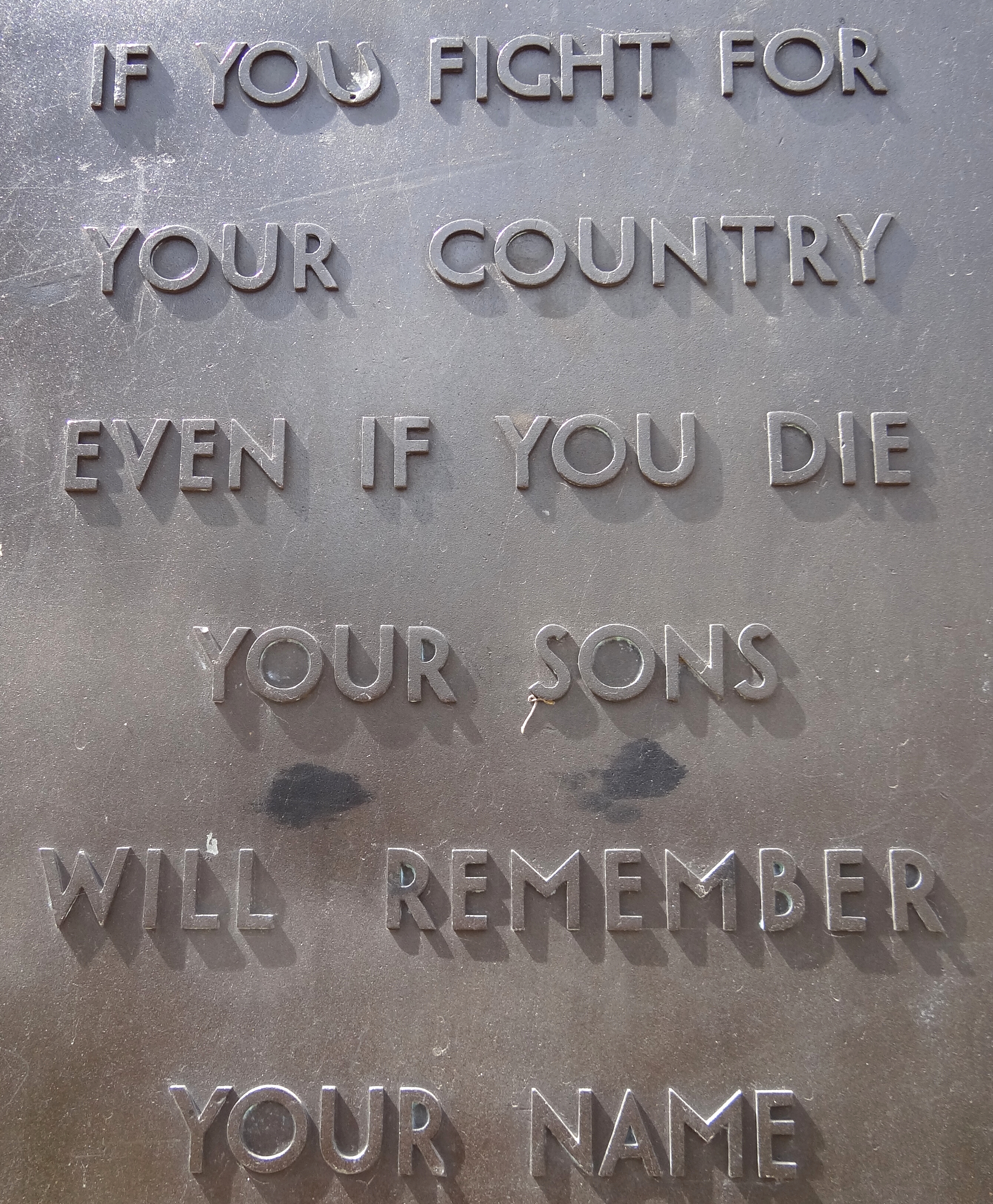
Inscription in English

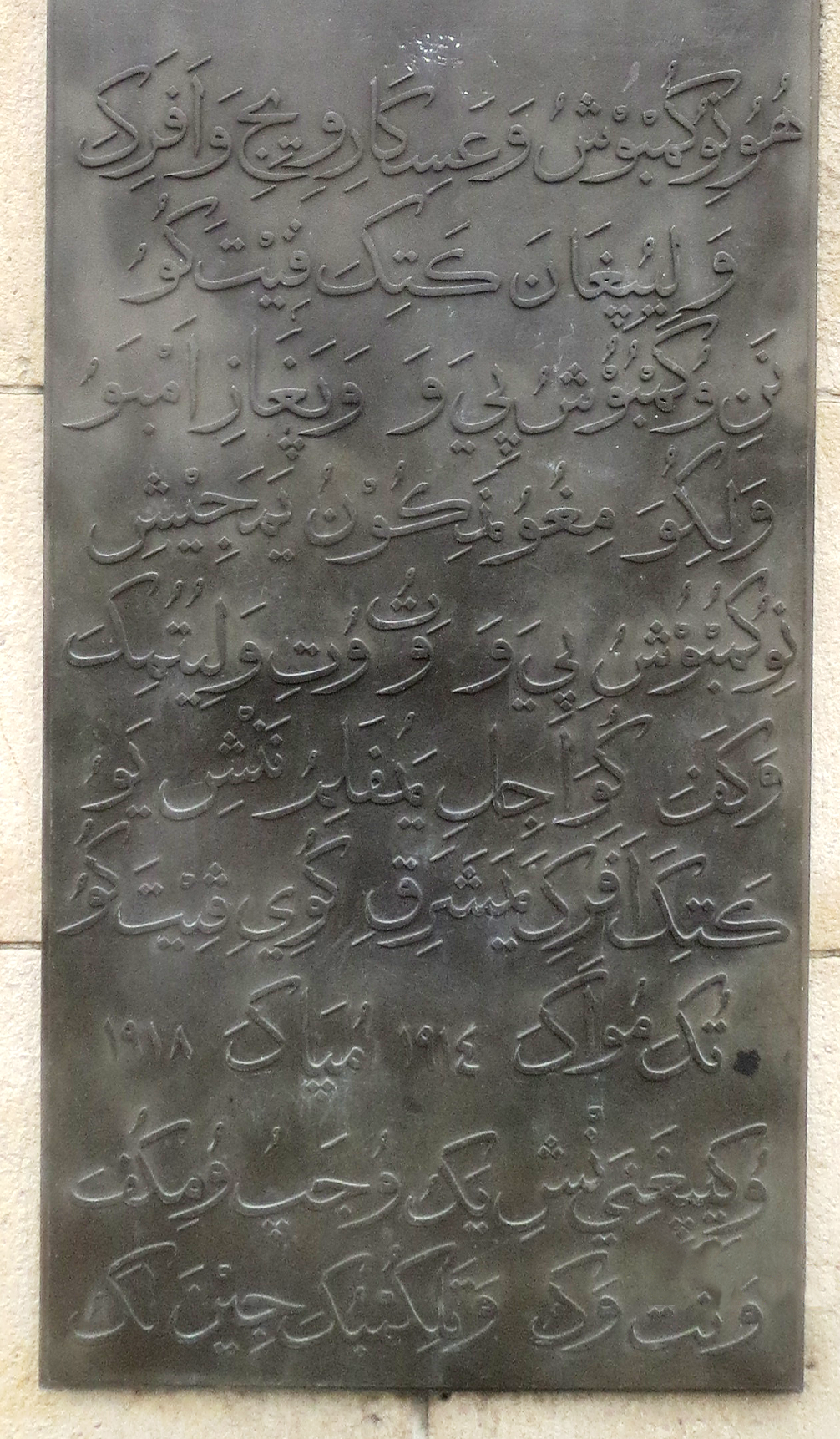
Memorial inscription in Swahili - Arabic script

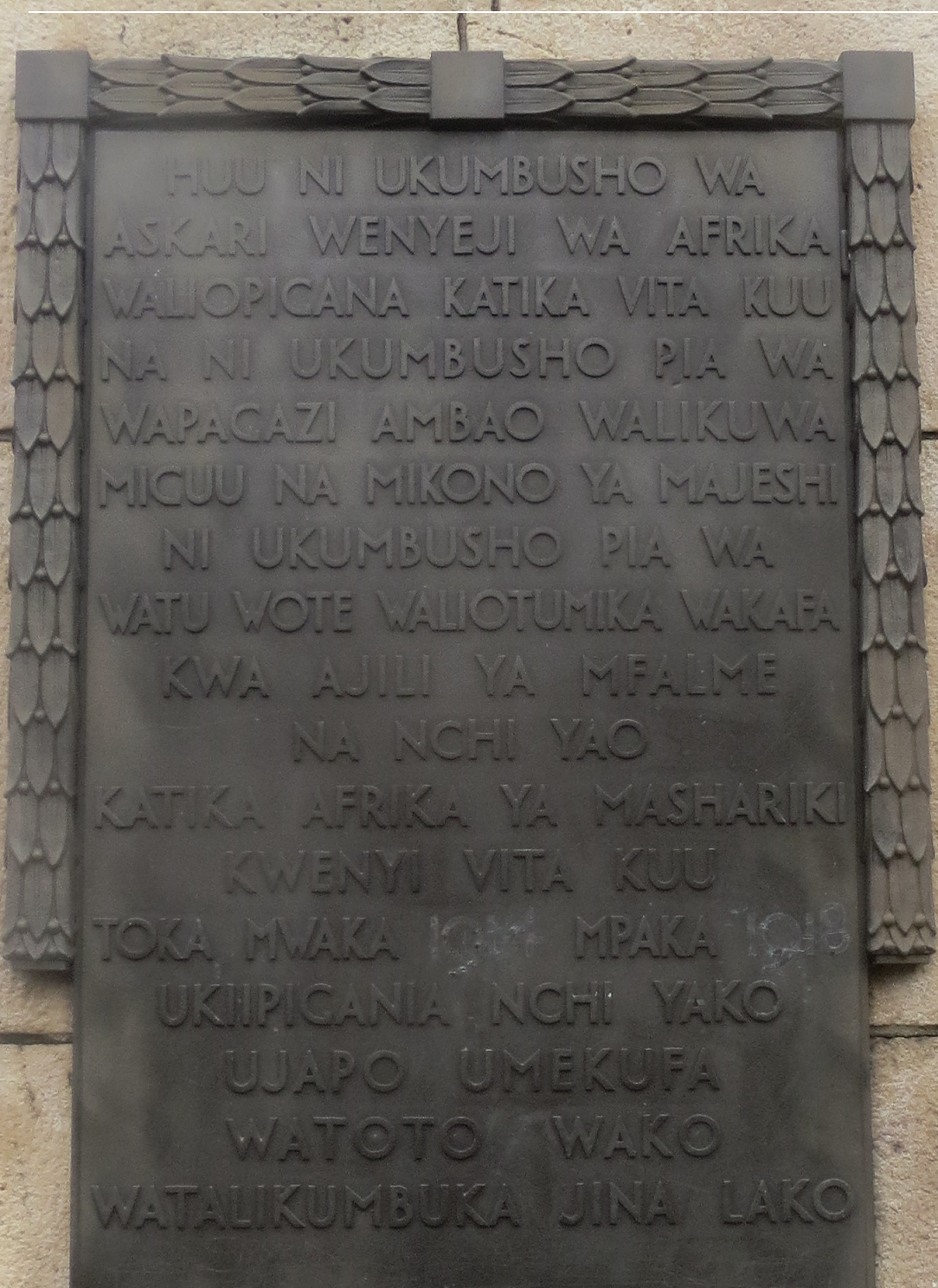
Memorial inscription in Swahili - Latin script
