= Wissmann Monument (Hamburg) =

Monument of German colonialist

The Wissmann Monument is a statue created by the sculptor Adolf Kürle in honor of the colonial governor Hermann von Wissmann who served between 1885 and 1886 as governor of German East Africa, a colonial territory that covers present-day Tanzania, Burundi, and Rwanda. The statue was erected in Dar es Salaam. Later politically disputed, it is now preserved in a museum in Hamburg. Its former location in Dar es Salaam is used for the Askari Monument.

== Appearance ==
The 2.6 meter high bronze statue of Wissmann was placed on the stone plinth. Wissmann is portrayed in the upright pose of a conqueror, in uniform and with a pith helmet, leaning on a sword, looking into the distance. At the foot of the plinth and at the feet of the Wissmann sculpture, looking up, stood the 1.7 meter high figure of an askari, wearing the typical uniform with a banded cap. He held a lowered imperial flag over the third figure, a killed lion. On the front of the pedestal was a plate with Wissmann's life dates, on the back there was an inscription in German that praised Wissmann's deeds and qualities. Inscribed on the left was a text in Arabic and on the right one in Swahili saying: "Our Lord of yore, he has calmed the coast and guided us to the right path."

== History ==
The monument was erected in Dar es Salaam on 3 April 1909. However, colonial monuments were removed by the British after they took control over the former German colonies. The Wissmann Monument was then moved to London for display as a trophy in the Imperial War Museum. German supporters successfully negotiated to get the statue back and re-erected it in front of the University of Hamburg. Thereby the monument helped to keep alive "the memory of the nation's common past overseas". After its destruction in World War II it was rebuilt in 1949.

In the 1960s, students were protesting the monument over a period of six years because of its glorification of colonialism which lead to the first attempt to take it down in August 1967. The attempt failed but the second attempt one month later was successful. After the rebuilding of the monument it was taken down for good in a third attempt in November 1968. The public authorities gave in and moved the monument into the basement of the Hamburg Observatory in Bergedorf for storage.

In 2004, a Hamburg artist, Jokinen, temporarily reinstalled the Wissmann Monument, arguing that it could now serve as its own “counter-monument”.
