= Mchafukoge =

Ward and district capital of Ilala District, Dar es Salaam Region

Mchafukoge Kata ya Mchafukoge (Swahili)
- Ward of Ilala District
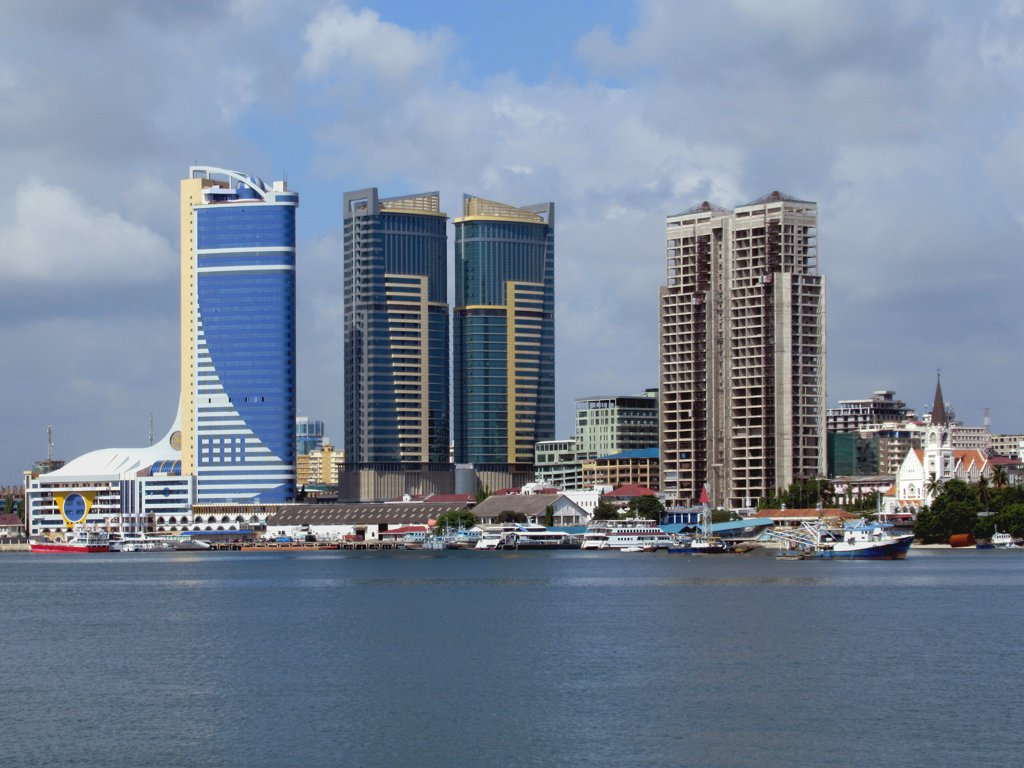
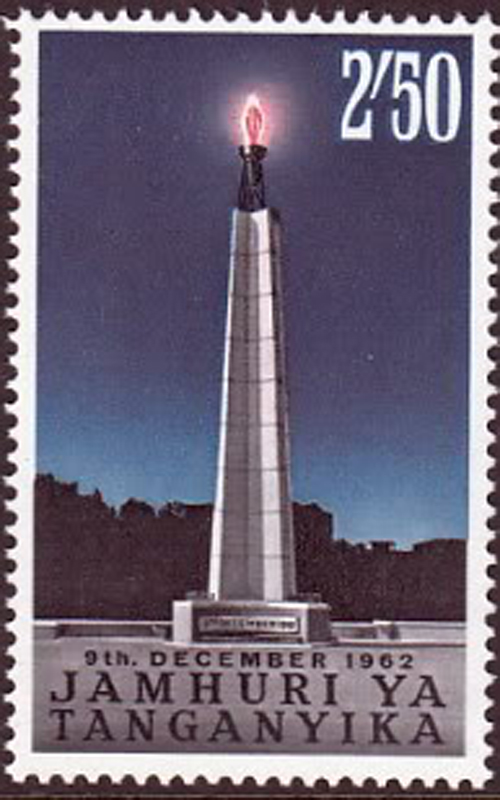
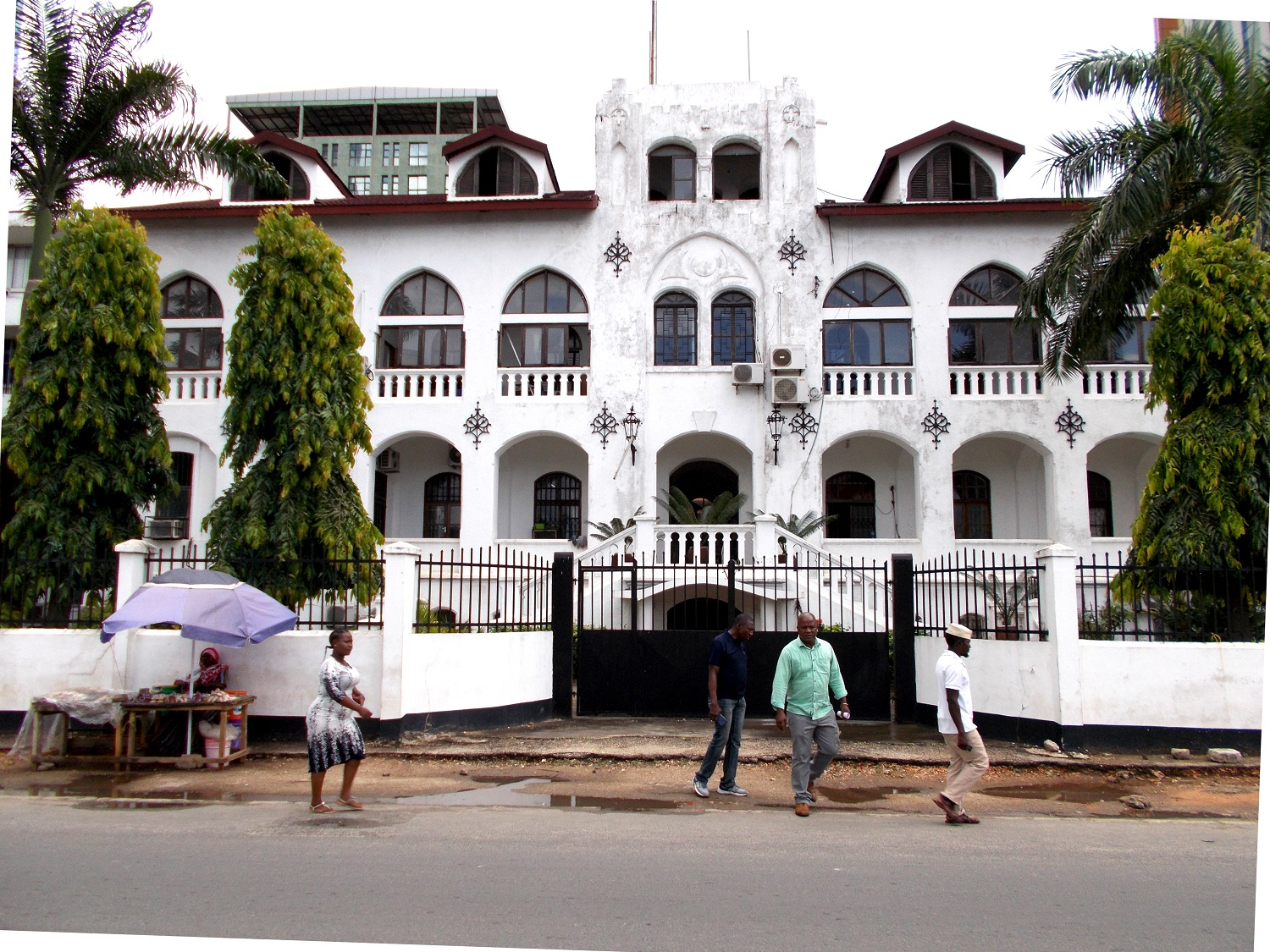
- From top to bottom: from left, Tanzania Ports Authority Tower & PSSSF Twin towers. Uhuru Monument, a Dar es Salaam landmark located in the ward & Historic Dar es Salaam City Hall

- Location within Tanzania
- Coordinates: 6°49′39.72″S 39°15′34.56″E
- Country: Tanzania
- Region: Dar es Salaam Region
- District: Ilala District

Area
  - Total: 2.126 km^{2} (0.821 sq mi)

Population (2022)
  - Total: 7,999
- Demonym: Mchafukogean

Ethnic groups
  - Settler: Swahili
  - Ancestral: Zaramo
- Tanzanian Postal Code: 11105

Mchafukoge (Kata ya Mchafukoge in Swahili) is an administrative ward and is the district capital of the Ilala district in the Dar es Salaam Region of Tanzania. The Kisutu and Kivukoni wards form the ward's northern boundary. The Dar es Salaam Harbor forms its eastern border. The Temeke District wards of Kurasini and Keko border it on the south. Kariakoo and Jangwani wards border the ward to the west. The ward is home to the Uhuru Monument, the Central Railway Station, and the headquarters for Tanzania Revenue Authority at Mapato House. In 2022, the population of the ward was 7,999.

== Administration ==
The postal code for Ilala Ward is 11105. The ward is divided into the following neighborhoods (Mitaa):

- Kitumbini
- Mchafukoge

=== Government ===
The ward, like every other ward in the country, has local government offices based on the population served.The Mchafukoge Ward administration building houses a court as per the Ward Tribunal Act of 1988, including other vital departments for the administration the ward. The ward has the following administration offices:

- Mchafukoge Ward Police Station located in Karume neighborhood
- Mchafukoge Ward Government Office (Afisa Mtendaji) in Shariff Shamba Neighborhood
- Mchafukoge Ward Tribunal (Baraza La Kata) is a Department inside Ward Government Office

In the local government system of Tanzania, the ward is the smallest democratic unit. Each ward is composed of a committee of eight elected council members which include a chairperson, one salaried officer (with no voting rights), and an executive officer. One-third of seats are reserved for women councillors.

== Education and health ==
=== Education ===
The ward is home to these educational institutions:

- Al-Hilal Primary School
- Jamhuri Secondary School
- Sunni Jamaat Secondary School
- Tanesco College

=== Healthcare ===
The ward is home to the following health institutions:

- Mnazi Mmoja Health Center
- Apollo Medical Center
- Aga Khan Town Health Center
- IDC Clinic
