= Jangwani =

Ward of Ilala District, Dar es Salaam Region

Jangawani Kata ya Jangwani (Swahili)
- Ward of Ilala District
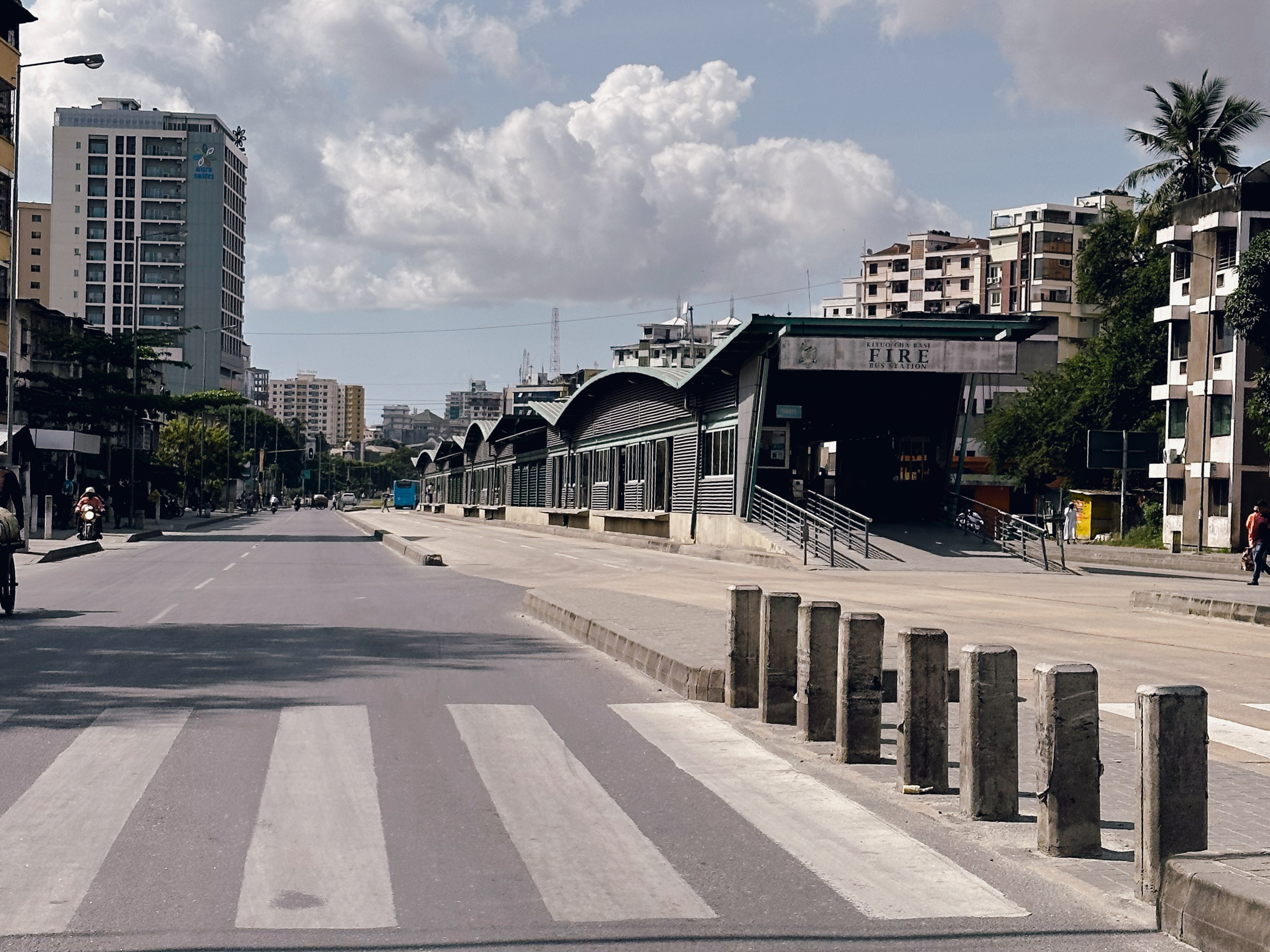
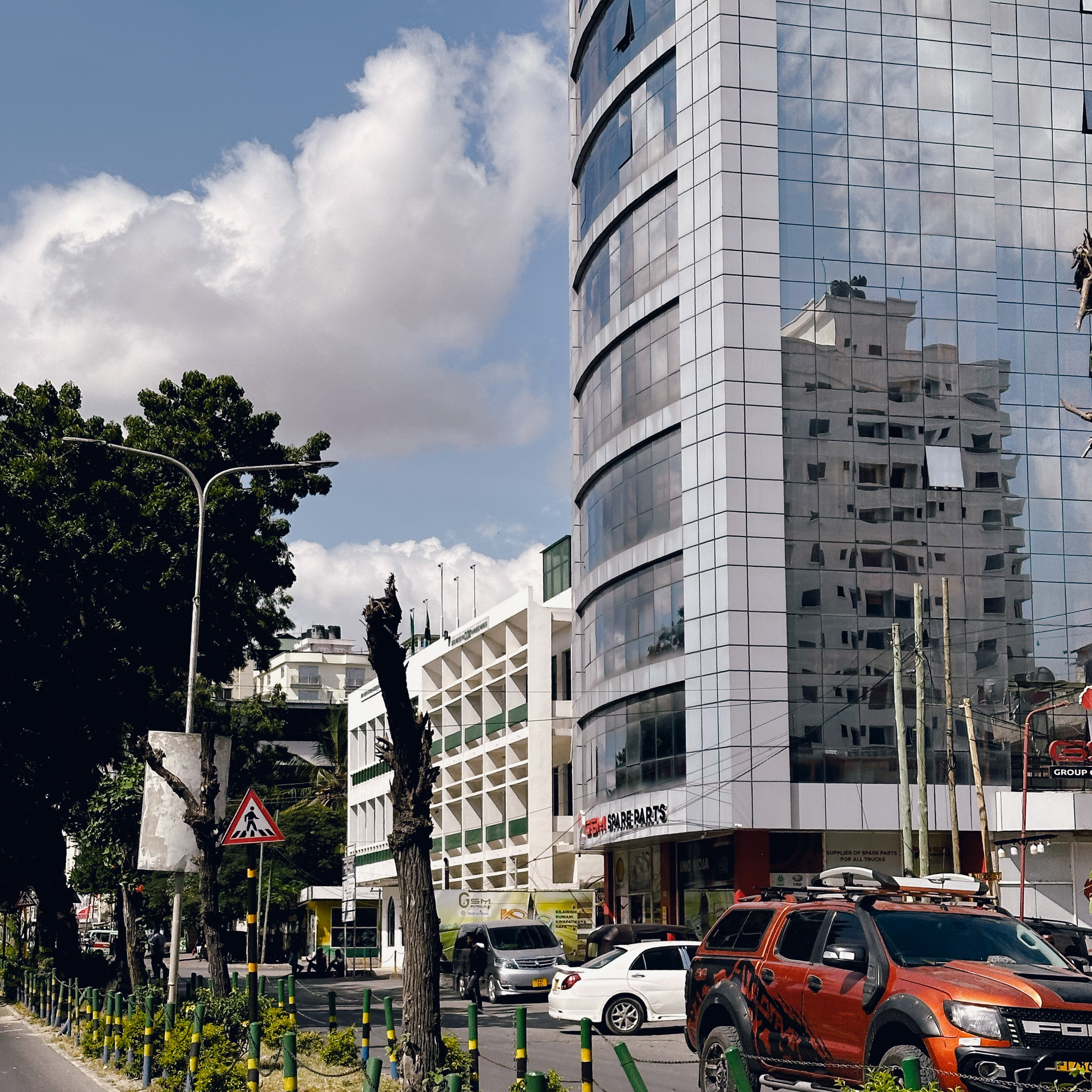
- From top to bottom: Crosswalk at UN avenue in Jangwani and street scene in Jangwani
- Interactive map of Jangawani
- Coordinates: 6°48′59.76″S 39°16′27.48″E
- Country: Tanzania
- Region: Dar es Salaam Region
- District: Ilala District

Area
  - Total: 0.6 km^{2} (0.23 sq mi)

Population (2012)
  - Total: 17,647

Ethnic groups
  - Settler: Swahili
  - Ancestral: Zaramo
- Tanzanian Postal Code: 11108

Jangwani (Kata ya Jangawani, in Swahili) is an administrative ward of the Ilala Municipical Council of the Dar es Salaam Region in Tanzania. The Upanga East and Upanga West wards border the ward on its northern side. The ward is bordered by Mchafukoge and Kisutu to the east. Mchikichini ward borders the ward to the west. The ward is bordered to the south by the Kariakoo ward. According to the 2012 census, the ward has a total population of 17,647.

== Administration ==
The postal code for the Jangwani ward is 11108. The ward is divided into the following neighborhoods (Mitaa):

- Mnazi Mmoja
- Mtambani 'A'

- Mtambani 'B'
- Ukombozi

=== Government ===
The ward, like every other ward in the country, has local government offices based on the population served.The Jangwani Ward administration building houses a court as per the Ward Tribunal Act of 1988, including other vital departments for the administration the ward. The ward has the following administration offices:

- Jangwani Ward Police Station located in Karume neighborhood
- Jangwani Ward Government Office (Afisa Mtendaji) in Shariff Shamba Neighborhood
- Jangwani Ward Tribunal (Baraza La Kata) is a Department inside Ward Government Office

In the local government system of Tanzania, the ward is the smallest democratic unit. Each ward is composed of a committee of eight elected council members which include a chairperson, one salaried officer (with no voting rights), and an executive officer. One-third of seats are reserved for women councillors.

== Demographics ==
The ward serves as the Zaramo people's ancestral home, along with much of the district. As the city developed throughout time, the ward became into a cosmopolitan ward. In total, 17,647 people called the ward home in 2012.

== Education and health ==
=== Education ===
The ward is home to these educational institutions

- Mnazi Mmoja Primary school
- Peninsula Primary School
- Alharamain Secondary School

=== Healthcare ===
The ward is home to the following health institutions:

- Zainab Clinic, Jangwani
- Abbas Medical Center, Jangwani
- Dr. Hameer Health Center
