= Japhet Killewo =

Tanzanian doctor and epidemiologist

Japhet Killewo is a Tanzanian doctor and epidemiologist in Kagera, Tanzania. He was the former Chair of Tanzanian Public Health Association and currently an epidemiology professor at Muhimbili University of Health and Allied Sciences (MUHAS). His research area focuses on HIV/AIDS epidemiology research in Kagera region in Tanzania. As a clinician, he also focuses on AIDS control and mother-to-child intervention in Tanzania. As a scholar, he publishes actively in international journals and participated in many projects across the globe, which are organised and supported by the European Union, as well as World Bank and USAIDS.

== Education ==
Japhet Killewo received his Bachelor of Medicine, Bachelor of Surgery from Makerere University, Masters from London School of Hygiene and Tropical Medicine (LSHTM) and PhD from Umea University in Sweden.

== Career ==
Killewo started his career as a district medical officer after graduated from Makerere University from 1976-1980. After obtaining his masters from London School of Hygiene and Tropical Medicine in public health, he led the Department of Epidemiology and Biostatistics at MUHAS from 1986-1997. During this period, he was also the Principal Investigator for Kagera AIDS Research Project (KARP), with an affiliation from Project SIDA. In 1997-1999, he served as programme manage at MUHAS Programme Management Unit. After which, he went to Bangladesh to lead the Reproductive Health Programme, working for the International Centre for Diarrheal Disease Research (ICDDRB) under the World Bank, and a collaboration between MUHAS and Harvard T.H Chan, School of Public Health. In 2003, he returned to MUHAS to continue his career in teaching and research. Other than conducting research, he also serves as editors for numerous journals and co-authored the textbook that are used in the field of Public Health. In 2010, the book named "Epidemiology and Demography in Public Health", was published by Academic Press/Elsevier and Killewo serves as the editor-in-chief. He also wrote a part of the book titled "International Encyclopedia of Public Health".

== Other appointments ==
Editorial Advisory Board, East Africa Journal of Public Health

Co-founder and Director, Apeck International Limited

Board Member for non-profit organisation in Tanzania, Management and Development for Health

Site Director, Fogarty Global Health Training Programme (Harvard-BU-NWU-UNM)
