= Uhuru Monument =

Monument in Dar es Salaam, Tanzania

- Mnara wa Uhuru (Swahili)
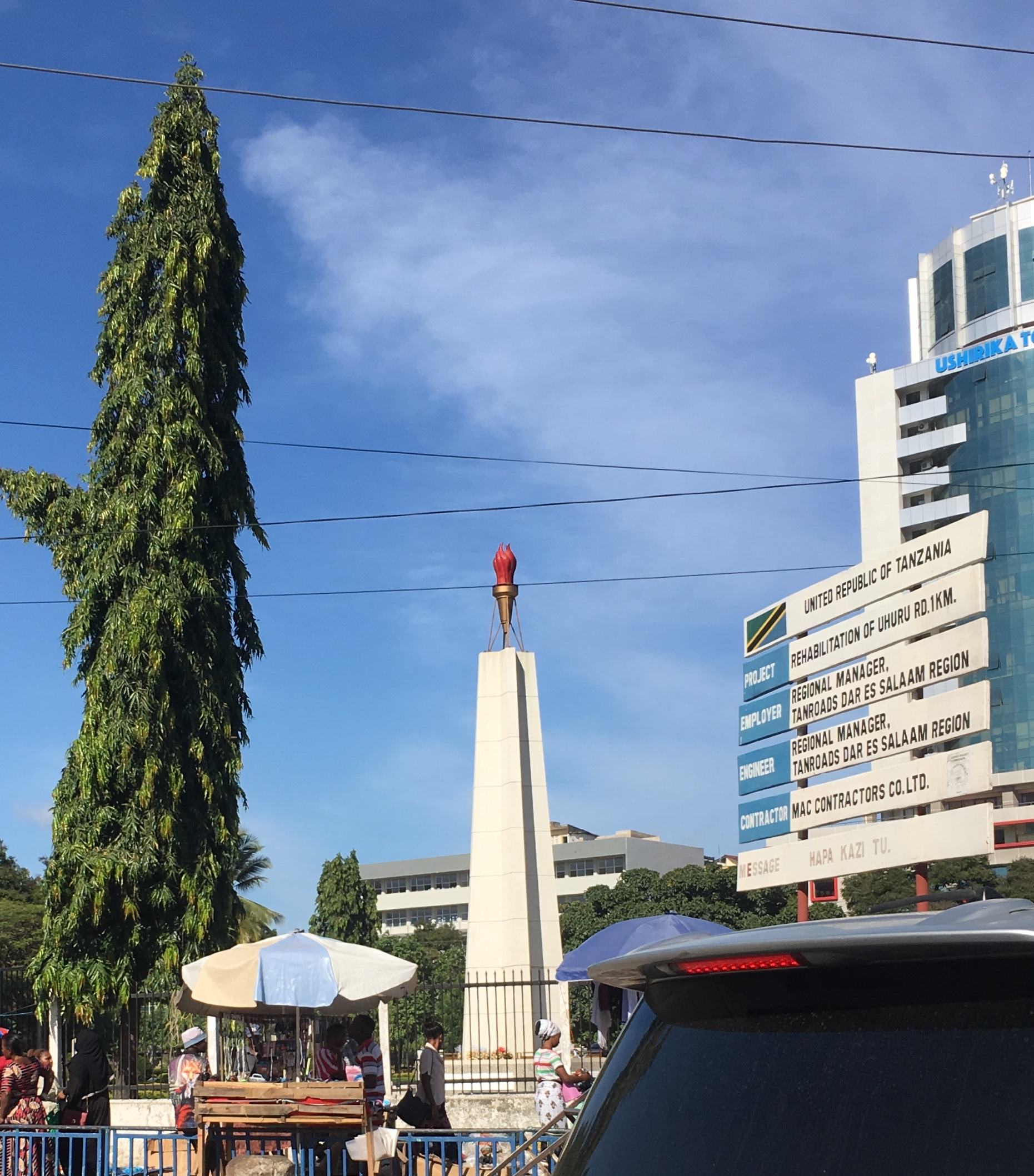
- Uhuru monument during the day time.
- Location: Junction of Bibi Titi Mohammed Street, Uhuru Street and Lumumba Street, Mnazi Mmoja Park, Mchafukoge ward, Ilala District; Dar es Salaam, East Tanzania.
- Coordinates: 6.8182°S 39.2795°E
- Dedicated to: Tanzania's independence

The Uhuru Monument (also known as Uhuru Torch Monument) is a landmark monument and tourist attraction located in Mchafukoge ward of Ilala District in Dar es Salaam Region, Tanzania. It is a white obelisk with a replica of the Uhuru Torch mounted at its top. It is located at the Mnazi Mmoja Park in the city centre and is partly fenced.

== Gallery ==
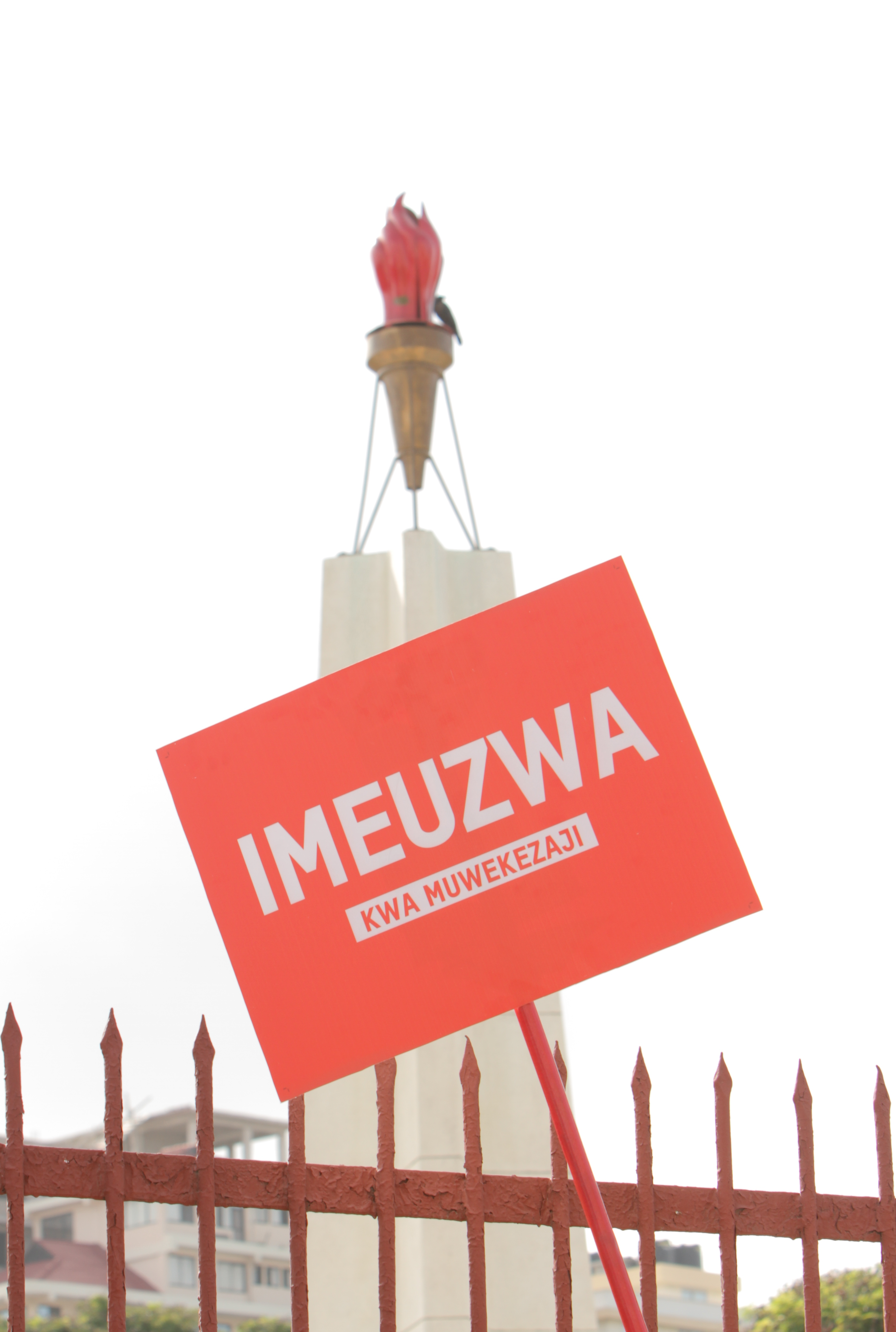
A "sold" sign placed by activists to protest land grabs during the day time.

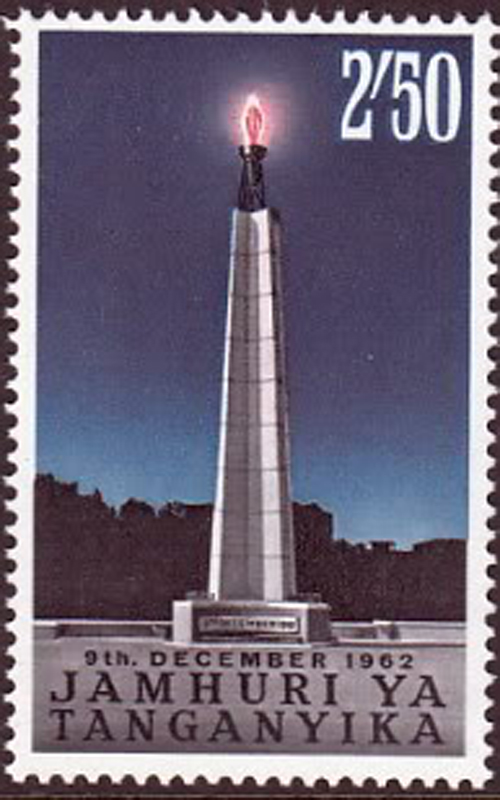
Uhuru Monument - Tanganyika Independence stamps 1962 (2'50 shilling stamp)

== See also ==
- History of Tanzania
