= Emmanuel Mwambulukutu =

Tanzanian politician and diplomat

Emmanuel Asajile Mwambulukutu (22 November 1944 – 14 August 2017) was a Tanzanian politician and diplomat. He was Tanzania's ambassador to South Africa until 2008. In 2007, he and his family were attacked during an armed robbery.

== Education ==
Mwambulukutu received a Master of Arts in Teaching and a Master of Philosophy in Economic Development from the University of Dar es Salaam. He received a master's degree from the Woodrow Wilson School of Public and International Affairs at Princeton University.

== Career ==
Mwambulukutu was elected as MP for Mbeya, and held that position from 1985 to 1995. In that position, he was Deputy Minister of Local Government Community Development Cooperatives and Marketing from 1988 to 1990, Deputy Minister of Regional Administration and Local Government from 1990 to 1991, Deputy Minister of Foreign Affairs and Global Cooperation from 1991 to 1993 and Deputy Minister of Lands, Housing and Urban Development from 1993 to 1995.

Mwambulukutu was then elected as MP for East Rungwe from 1995 to 2000. He was Deputy Minister of Internal Affairs from 1995 to 1999.

Mwambulukutu was the Ambassador from Tanzania to South Africa from 1999 to 2008.

== Personal life ==
Mwambulukutu had a wife and four children.

=== 2007 Attack ===
On 29 December 2007, Mwambulukutu was attacked and beaten unconscious by armed robbers at a dinner in Pretoria. Six other people with him, including his wife, were attacked and the assailants threatened to rape Mwambulukutu's daughter. After the attack, Mwambulukutu was reported to be in intensive care in stable condition at a hospital, though seriously injured. Although he recovered, the attack affected his health for the rest of his life.

=== Death ===
Mwambulukutu died from diabetes at Muhimbili National Hospital in Dar es Salaam.
