= USAID in Bangladesh =

United States government agency

USAID is a government agency of United States that works globally for extreme poverty, education, women's empowerment, global health and other issues. USAID also works in Bangladesh. They help in many sectors around Bangladesh. USAID became partner with it since 1971. Since then, it helping Bangladesh for gaining a status of being a middle income country by its 50th year of independence in 2021. The current mission director of USAID in Bangladesh is Janina Jaruzelski.

== In food issue ==
For not suffering from lack of nutrition and for reaching good food to the rural people in Bangladesh, USAID works here for solving it. On November 30, USAID in partnership with Ministry of Disaster Management and Relief (MoDM&R) for making sure food nutrition and security in Satkhira district and four Upazilas in Khulna division. It is five year food peace project and the project name is Nobo Jatra.

== Trade ==
The USAID provides technical support to Bangladesh in making information about customs and laws available which helps make trade easier.

== Helping refugees ==
Since August 25, Military operations in Rakhain state Myanmar have forced many Rohingyas to flee into Myanmar's neighboring country Bangladesh. About 868000 Rohingya people have fled from Rakhain state to Bangladesh since military operations began. USAID's Office of Food for Peace donated $7.6 million for giving food to the Rohingya in Bangladeshi refugee camps.
