= Kivukoni =

Ward of Ilala District, Dar es Salaam Region

Kivukoni Kata ya Kivukoni (Swahili)
- Ward of Ilala District
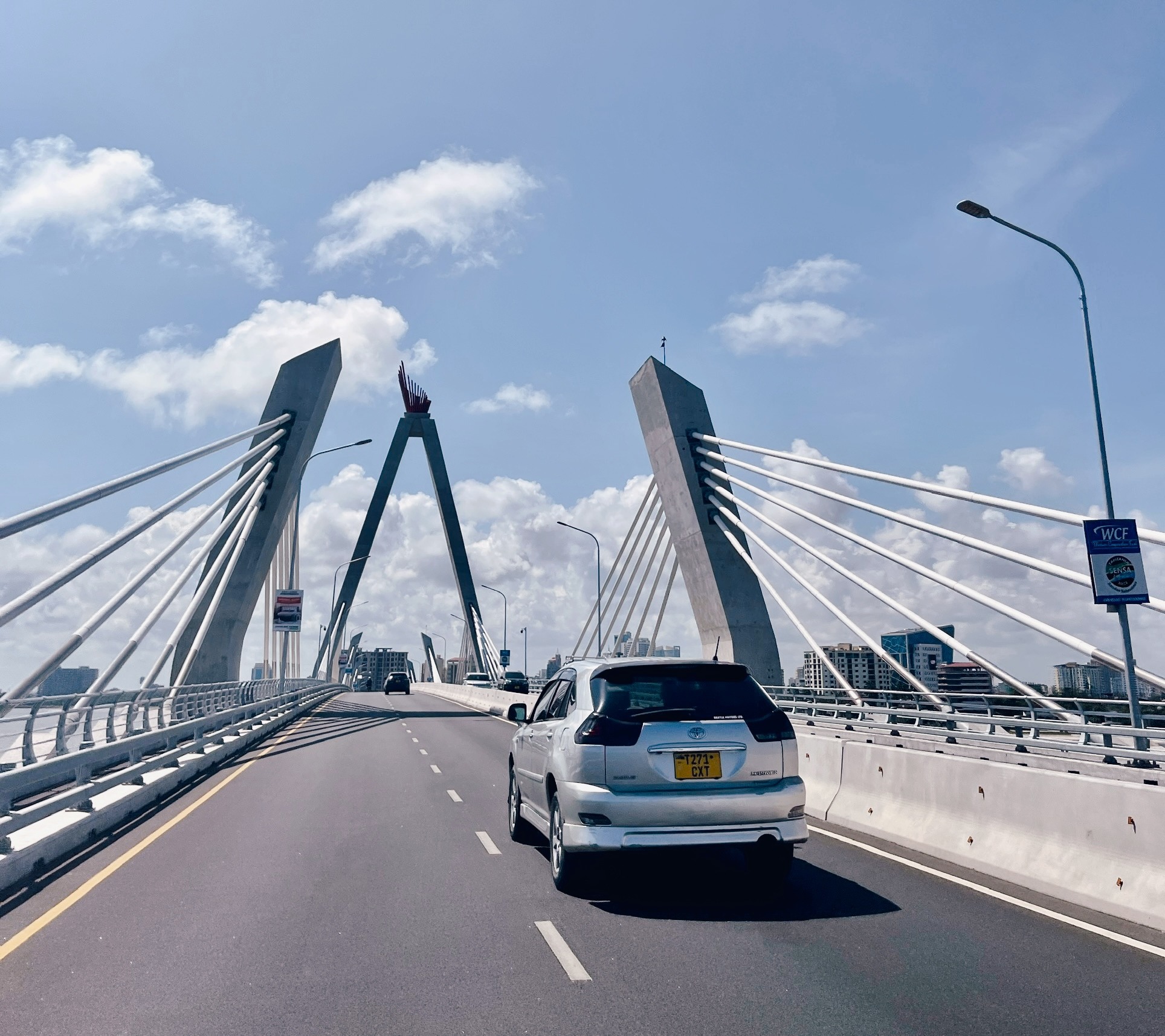
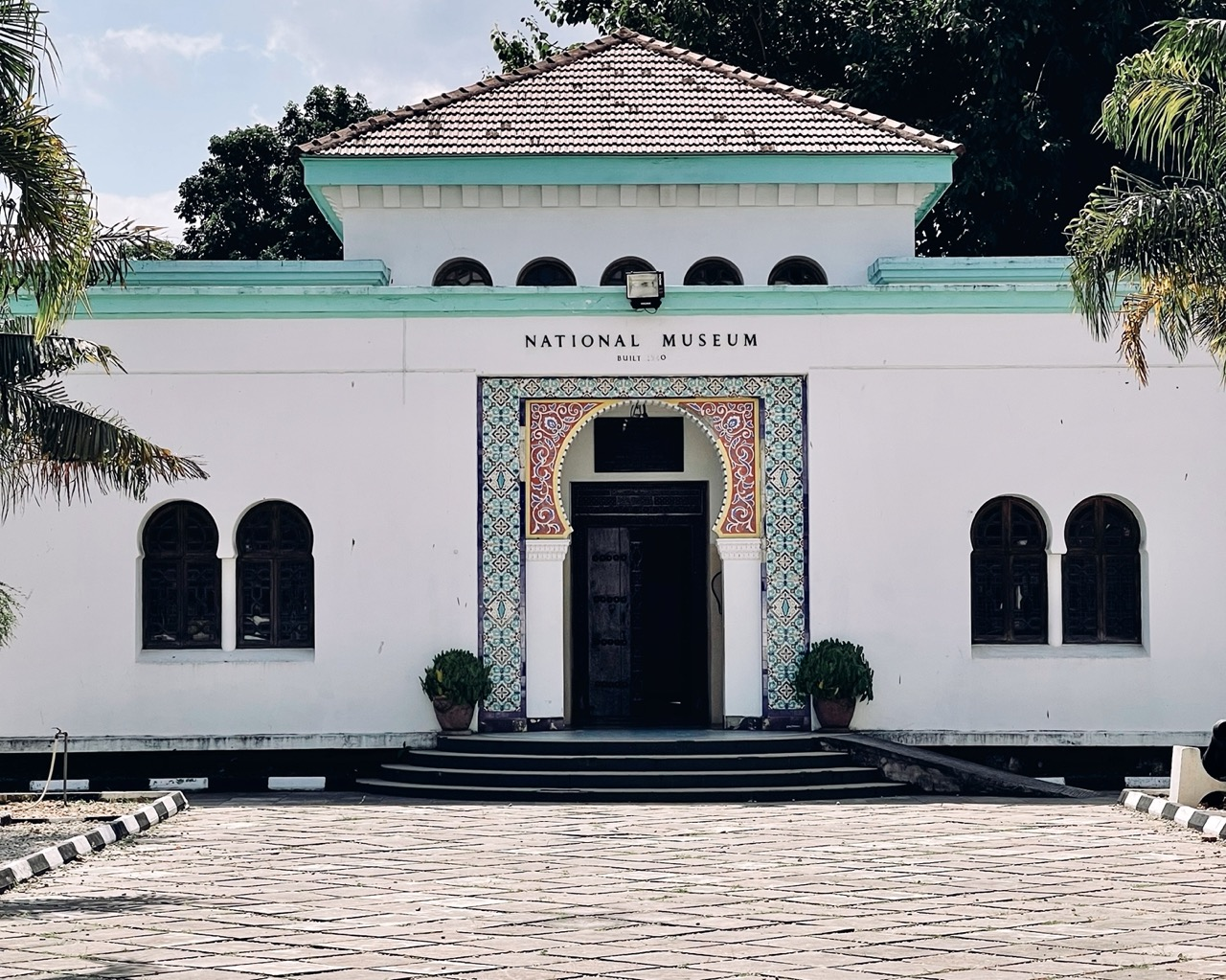
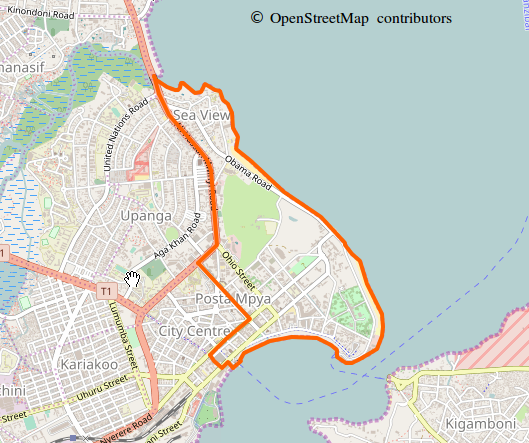
- From top to bottom: The Tanzanite Bridge connecting Kivukoni ward with Oysterbay ward, National Museum & Map of Kivukoni ward
- Nickname: The crossing place
- Interactive map of Kivukoni
- Coordinates: 6°48′51.12″S 39°17′24.36″E
- Country: Tanzania
- Region: Dar es Salaam Region
- District: Ilala District

Area
  - Total: 2.38 km^{2} (0.92 sq mi)
- Elevation: 11 m (36 ft)

Population (2022)
  - Total: 4,045
  - Density: 2,824/km^{2} (7,310/sq mi)

Ethnic groups
  - Settler: Swahili
  - Ancestral: Zaramo
- Tanzanian Postal Code: 11101

Kivukoni (Kata ya Kivukoni, in Swahili) is an administrative ward of the Ilala Municipical Council of the Dar es Salaam Region in Tanzania. Kivikoni's name come from the Swahili word meaning "a crossing place". The ward is bordered by Upanga East ward to the west, Kisutu ward to the southwest, and Kigamboni ward across the Kivukoni channel. The ward covers an area of 2.387 km^{2} (0.922 sq mi). Kivukoni ward is one of the most important wards in the country, as it is home to the Ikulu, which is the home of the president of Tanzania. Kivukoni ward is also home to the National Museum of Tanzania. According to the 2022 census, the ward had a total population of 4,045.

== Administration ==
The postal code for the Jangwani ward is 11101. The ward is divided into the following neighborhoods (Mitaa):

- Kivukoni, Kivukoni

- Seaview

=== Government ===
The ward, like every other ward in the country, has local government offices based on the population served.The Jangwani Ward administration building houses a court as per the Ward Tribunal Act of 1988, including other vital departments for the administration the ward. The ward has the following administration offices:

- Kivukoni Ward Police Station located in Karume neighborhood
- Kivukoni Ward Government Office (Afisa Mtendaji) in Shariff Shamba Neighborhood
- Kivukoni Ward Tribunal (Baraza La Kata) is a Department inside Ward Government Office

In the local government system of Tanzania, the ward is the smallest democratic unit. Each ward is composed of a committee of eight elected council members which include a chairperson, one salaried officer (with no voting rights), and an executive officer. One-third of seats are reserved for women councillors.

== Economy ==
Kivukoni hosts a huge number of embassies for a small ward. Therefore, they support a number of businesses in the area. The ward is home to the Mzizima Fish Market and the Kivukoni Fish Market both are some of the largest fish markets in the country. Kivukoni is a hub for tourism and hosting some of the largest hotels in the country. Kivukoni hosts the historic Askari Monument.

== Demographics ==
The ward serves as the Zaramo people's ancestral home, along with much of the district. As the city developed throughout time, the ward became into a cosmopolitan ward. In total, 4,045 people called the ward home in 2022.

== Education and health ==
=== Education ===
The ward is home to these educational institutions

- Bunge Primary School

=== Healthcare ===
The ward is home to the following health institutions:

- Ocean Road Cancer Institute (private)
- National Institute for Medical Research, Kivukoni

== Government offices ==
Kivukoni hosts the following government offices:

1. National Development Corporation (NDC)
2. The Bank of Tanzania
3. The Ministry of Constitutions and Legal Affairs
4. The Ministry of Education, Science and Technology
5. The Ministry of Energy and Minerals
6. The Ministry of Finance and Planning
7. The Ministry of Foreign Affairs
8. The Ministry of Health and Social Welfare
9. The Ministry of Lands and Human Settlements
10. The National Bureau of Statistics
11. The Prime Minister's Office
12. The Public Service Office and Good Governance
13. The State House of Tanzania known as the 'Ikulu' in Kiswahili language.
14. The Supreme Court of Tanzania
15. The Tanzania Buildings Agency
16. The Tanzania Investment Centre
