= Dennis Burton (immunologist) =

British immunologist

- Education: Oxford University; Lund University
- Occupation: professor
- Years active: 1979-date
- Organization: Scripps Research Institute
- Known for: AIDS vaccine research
- Title: Professor
- Term: 1990-date
- Board member of: NIH Center for HIV/AIDS Vaccine Immunology and Immunogen Discovery
- Awards: NIH Awards
- Website: scripps.edu/burton

Dennis R. Burton (born 1952) is a professor of immunology and microbiology at the Scripps Research Institute in La Jolla, California, in the United States. He also works in AIDS vaccine research, and is scientific director of the IAVI Neutralizing Antibody Center there. He sits on the steering committee of the Ragon Institute of Massachusetts General Hospital, MIT and Harvard.

He has a BA in chemistry from the University of Oxford, and a PhD in nuclear magnetic resonance in biology from Lund University in Lund, Sweden.

== Awards ==
- Jenner Fellowship of the Lister Institute
- Fellowship in the American Academy of Microbiology
- James and Jessie Minor Chair in Immunology
- NIH Merit Award

== Academic and Professional Experience ==
- 2015-2017 Chairman, Immunology and Microbial Science (IMS) Scripps Research
- 1991-2017 Professor, Immunology and Microbial Science (IMS) Scripps Research
- 2015-2015 Distinguished Lecturer, The American Association of Immunologists
- 2012 Professor (Joint Appointment), Molecular Biology, Scripps Research
- 1990-1991 Personal Chair, The University of Sheffield
- 1989-1991 Visiting Member, Research Institute of Scripps Clinic
- 1985-1991 Jenner Fellow, Lister Institute of Preventive Medicine
- 1987-1990 Senior Lecturer in Biochemistry, The University of Sheffield
- 1981-1987 Lecturer in Biochemistry, The University of Sheffield
- 1980-1981 Junior Research Fellow, Wolfson College, University of Oxford
- 1979-1981 Medical Research Council Training Fellowship, University of Oxford

== Personal life ==
Burton plays football twice a week.
