= Upanga West =

Ward of Ilala District, Dar es Salaam Region

Upanga West Kata ya Upanga Magharibi (Swahili)
- Ward of Ilala District
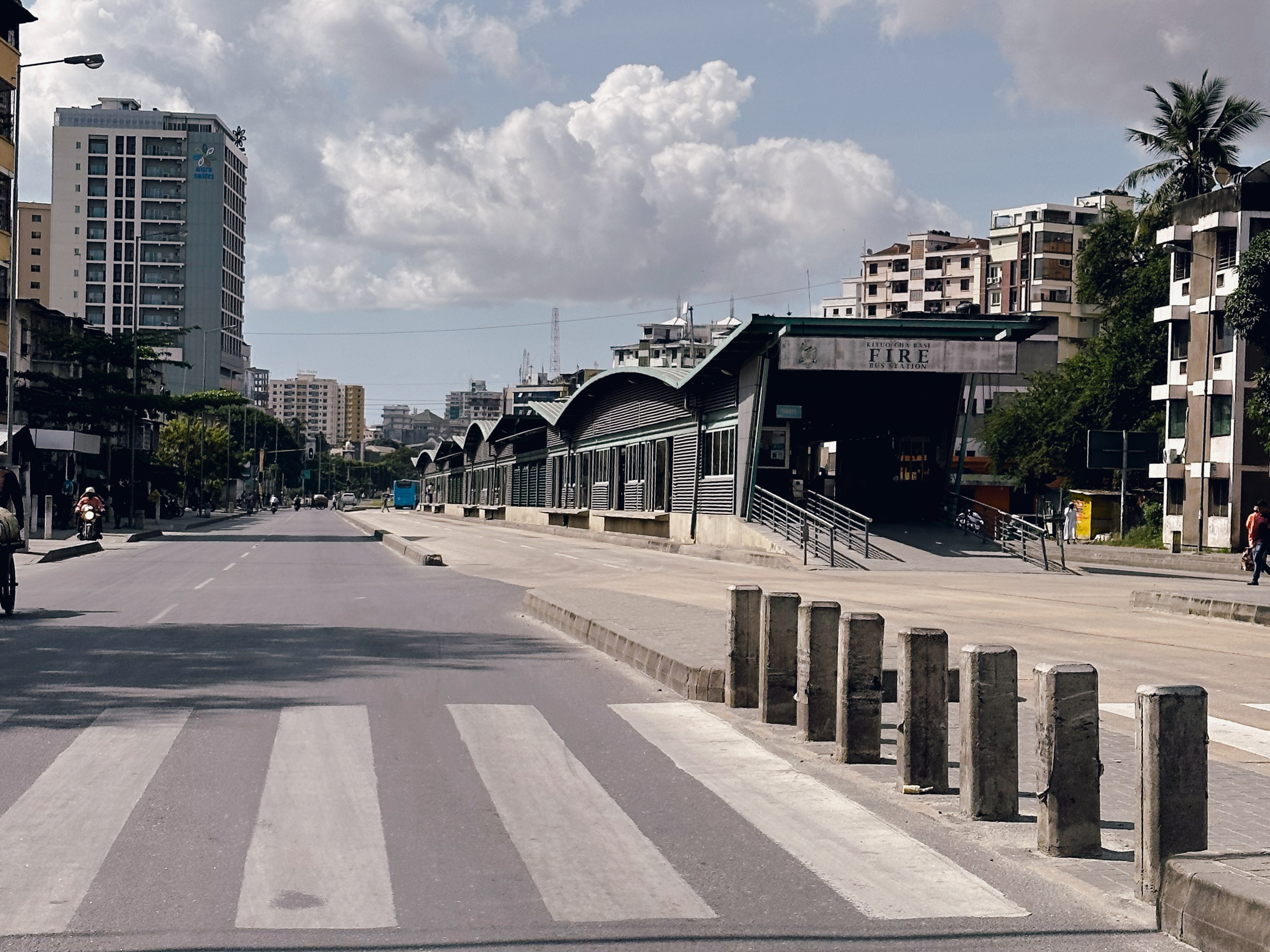
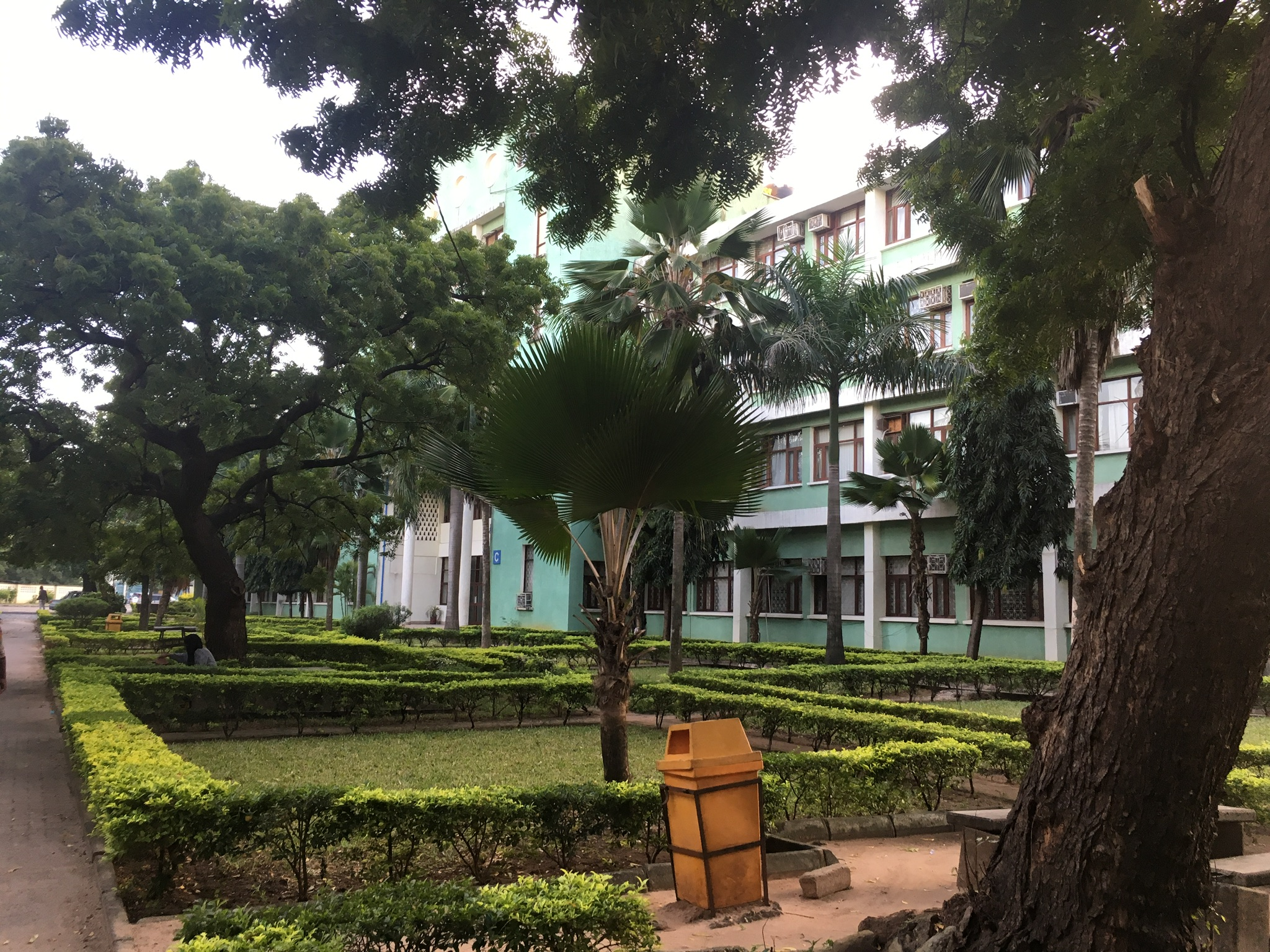
- From top to bottom: UN Ave next to Jangwani ward in Upanga West & Muhimbili University of Health and Allied Sciences
- Interactive map of Upanga West
- Coordinates: 6°48′19.8″S 39°16′25.68″E
- Country: Tanzania
- Region: Dar es Salaam Region
- District: Ilala District

Area
  - Total: 1.4 km^{2} (0.54 sq mi)

Population (2012)
  - Total: 13,476

Ethnic groups
  - Settler: Swahili & Indians
  - Ancestral: Zaramo
- Tanzanian Postal Code: 11103

Upanga West (Kata ya Upanga Magharibi, in Swahili) is an administrative ward of the Ilala Municipical Council of the Dar es Salaam Region in Tanzania. Hananasif of Kinondoni is the northern boundary of the ward. Upanga East borders the ward on the east, and Mchikichini, Mzimuni, and Jangwani border it on the south. Magomeni of Kinondoni, borders the ward to the west. The ward is home to the largest hospital in the country, Muhimbili Hospital. The ward is also home of the Union Sports Club. According to the 2012 census, the ward has a total population of 13,476.

== Administration ==
The postal code for the Upanga West ward is 11103. The ward is divided into the following neighborhoods (Mitaa):

- Charambe
- Fire, Upanga West

- Mafaume, Upanga West

=== Government ===
The ward, like every other ward in the country, has local government offices based on the population served.The Upanga West Ward administration building houses a court as per the Ward Tribunal Act of 1988, including other vital departments for the administration of the ward. The ward has the following administration offices:

- Upanga Magharibi Police Station
- Upanga Magharibi Government Office (Afisa Mtendaji)
- Upanga Magharibi Tribunal (Baraza La Kata) is a Department inside Ward Government Office

In the local government system of Tanzania, the ward is the smallest democratic unit. Each ward is composed of a committee of eight elected council members which include a chairperson, one salaried officer (with no voting rights), and an executive officer. One-third of seats are reserved for women councillors.

== Demographics ==
The ward serves as the Zaramo people's ancestral home, along with much of the district. As the city developed throughout time, the ward became a cosmopolitan ward. In fact the ward together with Upanga East have the largest concentration of Indians immigrant community in the country. In total, 13,476 people called the ward home in 2012.

== Education and health ==
=== Education ===
The ward is home to these educational institutions

- The Jangwani Girls Secondary School
- The Al Muntazir Union Nursery School
- The Tambaza High School
- The International School of Tanganyika: Administration block and Elementary School
- The Al Muntazir Girls’ Primary School
- The Al Muntazir Boys Islamic Seminary
- The Al Muntazir Girls Islamic Seminary

=== Healthcare ===
The ward is home to the following health institutions:

- The Muhimbili University of Health and Allied Sciences
- The Muhimbili National Hospital
- The Muhimbili Orthopaedic Institute
