= Muhimbili National Hospital =

Hospital in Dar es Salaam, Tanzania

Geography
- Location: Upanga West, Ilala District, Dar es Salaam Region, Tanzania
- Coordinates: 6.80773°S 39.27221°E

Organisation
- Type: General, Teaching Hospital
- Affiliated university: Muhimbili University of Health and Allied Sciences

Services
- Emergency department: Yes
- Beds: 1500

History
- Former names: Muhimbili Medical Center; Princess Margaret Hospital; Sewa Haji Hospital
- Opened: 1897

Links
- Website: www.mnh.or.tz

Muhimbili National Hospital (Hospitali ya Taifa ya Muhimbili, in Swahili) is a 1500-bed public teaching hospital located in Upanga West ward of Ilala District in Dar es Salaam Region of Tanzania. It is the national referral hospital as well as academic and research facility for the Muhimbili University of Health and Allied Sciences. It offers speciality care across the spectrum of clinical medicine. About 40% of its beds are for private patients. The hospital employs around 2705 workers including 328 doctors and 946 nurses.

== History ==
The hospital traces its origins back to 1897 and was originally the Sewa Haji Hospital. British colonialism saw the hospital renamed to the Princess Margaret Hospital in 1956. After the country achieved independence in 1961, it was renamed to Muhimbili Medical Center and then eventually Muhimbili National Hospital, after separation from the Muhimbili University of Health and Allied Sciences. The grounds for the hospital also houses now independent institutes, the Jakaya Kikwete Cardiac Institute and the Muhimbili Orthopaedic Institute which cater to those specific populations of patients. In collaboration with its affiliate university, Muhimbili University of Health and Allied Sciences, the hospital facilitates both undergraduate clinical rotations and residency programmes.

== Facilities ==
=== Emergency ===
The fully-equipment emergency department as it currently stands was opened in 2010 in collaboration with Abbott sees over 60,000 patients a year.

=== Surgery ===
The hospital started the country's first kidney transplant service in November 2017. It also performs cochlear implants and bone marrow transplants and has separated conjoined twins successfully.

=== Psychiatry ===
It has Tanzania's first medication-assisted therapy (MAT) clinic to treat opioid addiction.

== See also ==
- Mloganzila Hospital
