= Muhimbili University of Health and Allied Sciences =

University in Ilala District, Dar es Salaam Region

Coordinates: 06°48′28″S 39°16′24″E

- Chuo Kikuu cha Afya na Sayansi Shirikishi Muhimbili (Swahili)
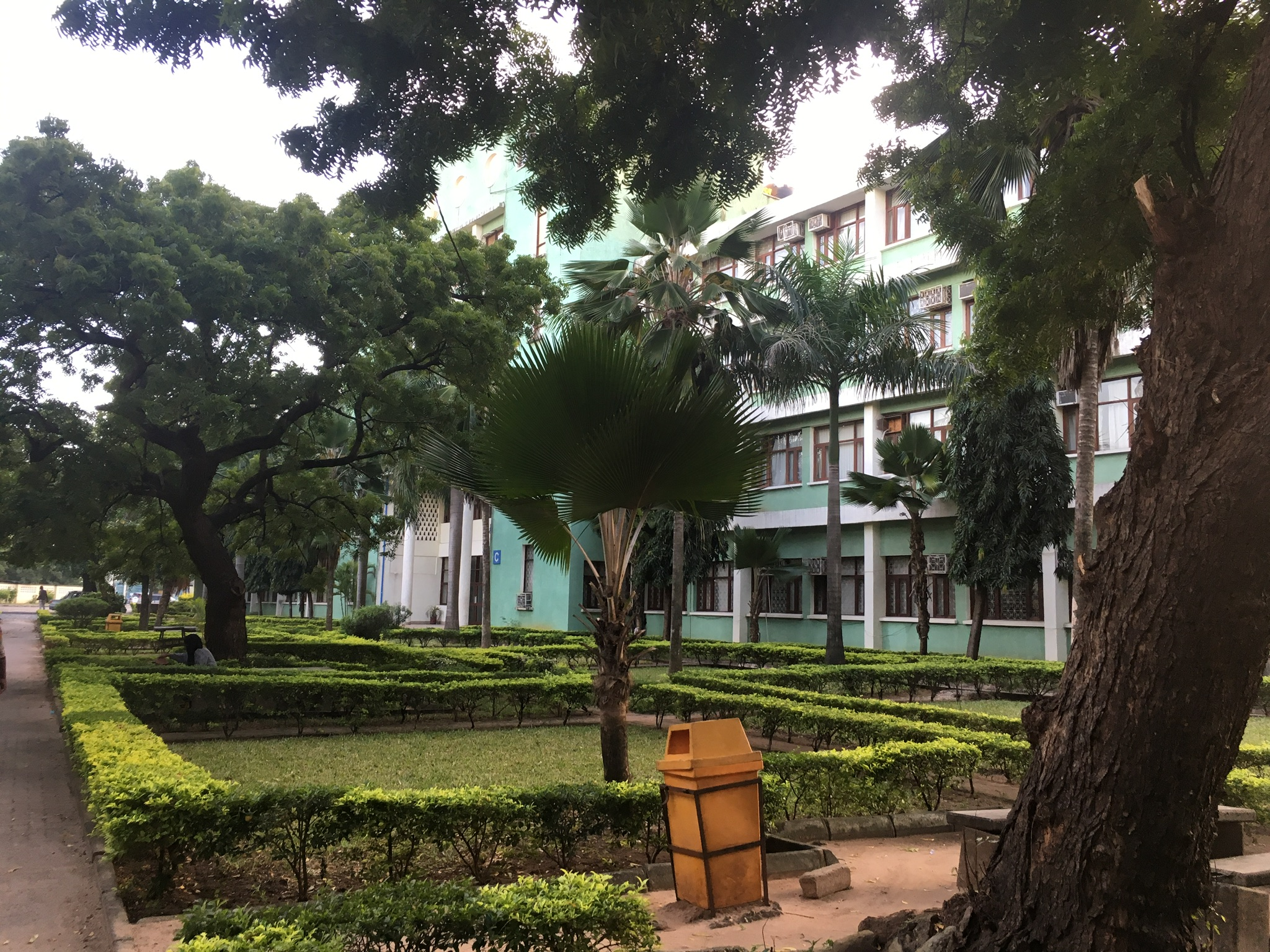
- Former name: Muhimbili University College of Health Sciences
- Motto: Elimu. Tiba. Utafiti. (Swahili)
- Motto in English: Education. Consultancy. Research.
- Type: Public
- Established: 1963; 63 years ago
- Parent institution: Ministry of Education, Science and Technology
- Chairman: Dr. Harrison George Mwakyembe
- Chancellor: Ali Hassan Mwinyi
- Vice-Chancellor: Prof. Appolinary Kamuhabwa
- Academic staff: 306
- Administrative staff: 342
- Students: 3,861
- Undergraduates: 3,172
- Postgraduates: 662
- Doctoral students: 29
- Location: United Nations Road, Upanga West, Ilala District, Dar es Salaam Region, Tanzania
- Campus: Urban
- Colours: Blue, Red, White
- Website: University Website

Muhimbili University of Health and Allied Sciences (MUHAS) (Swahili:Chuo Kikuu cha Afya na Sayansi Shirikishi Muhimbili) is a public university located in Upanga West, Ilala District of Dar es Salaam Region in Tanzania. It is accredited by the Tanzania Commission for Universities (TCU).

== Location ==
As of June 2018, the university had two campuses:

- The Main Campus along United Nations Road, in Upanga West, in the city of Dar es Salaam.
- The Mloganzila Campus, approximately 31 kilometres (19 mi) west of Muhimbili Hospital, along the A-7 Highway. This campus hosts a 571-bed, start-of-art teaching hospital.
- The university maintains a teaching facility in the town of Bagamoyo, about 66 kilometres (41 mi), by road, north-west of Dar es Salaam.
- The university also maintains a student hostel located along Chole Road, Masaki, in Dar es Salaam.

== History ==
The Muhimbili University of Health and Allied Sciences traces its origins to 1963, when it opened as Dar es Salaam Medical School. The school became the faculty of medicine of the University of Dar es Salaam, in 1968. In 1976, the Faculty of Medicine was incorporated into Muhimbili Hospital to form the Muhimbili Medical Centre (MMC).

The Parliament Act No. 9 of 1991, upgraded the faculty to a college of Dar es Salaam, the Muhimbili University College of Health Sciences (MUCHS). In 2000, by Act of Parliament, the government disestablished MMC and created two closely linked but autonomous public institutions: MUCHS and the Muhimbili National Hospital (MNH). Over the years, MUCHS made significant achievements in increasing student enrollment and developing several new academic programmes. The Parliament Act No. 9 of 1991 that established MUCHS was repealed in 2005. In 2007, MUHAS was established by Article 1 of the Charter of Incorporation, in line with the recommendations of the Tanzania Commission of Universities.

== Research ==
Research features prominently in the institutional focus of the Muhimbili University of Health and Allied Sciences. The university is engaged in over 40 major research endeavours. They range from ‘vitamin trials among the children of HIV-infected women’ to an examination of ‘health insurance in developing countries’ and from a study of the ‘social and contextual predictors of male heterosexual risk behaviour in Africa’ to one that looks at ‘the effect of multivitamin supplements on clinical and immunological response in childhood tuberculosis’. Research partners include the European Union and several European and American universities.

== Programmes ==
Muhimbili University of Health and Allied Sciences offers programmes in Medicine, Ophthalmology, Dentistry, Pharmacy, Nursing, Public Health, Traditional Medicine, Laboratory technician and Allied Sciences at undergraduate and postgraduate levels.

== Notable faculty ==
- Julie Makani, haematologist
- Japhet Killewo, professor at MUHAS
- Karim Manji, professor at MUHAS

== See also ==
- Category:Muhimbili University of Health and Allied Sciences alumni
