= Kariakoo =

Ward of Ilala District, Dar es Salaam Region

Kariakoo Kata ya Kariakoo (Swahili)
- Ward of Ilala District
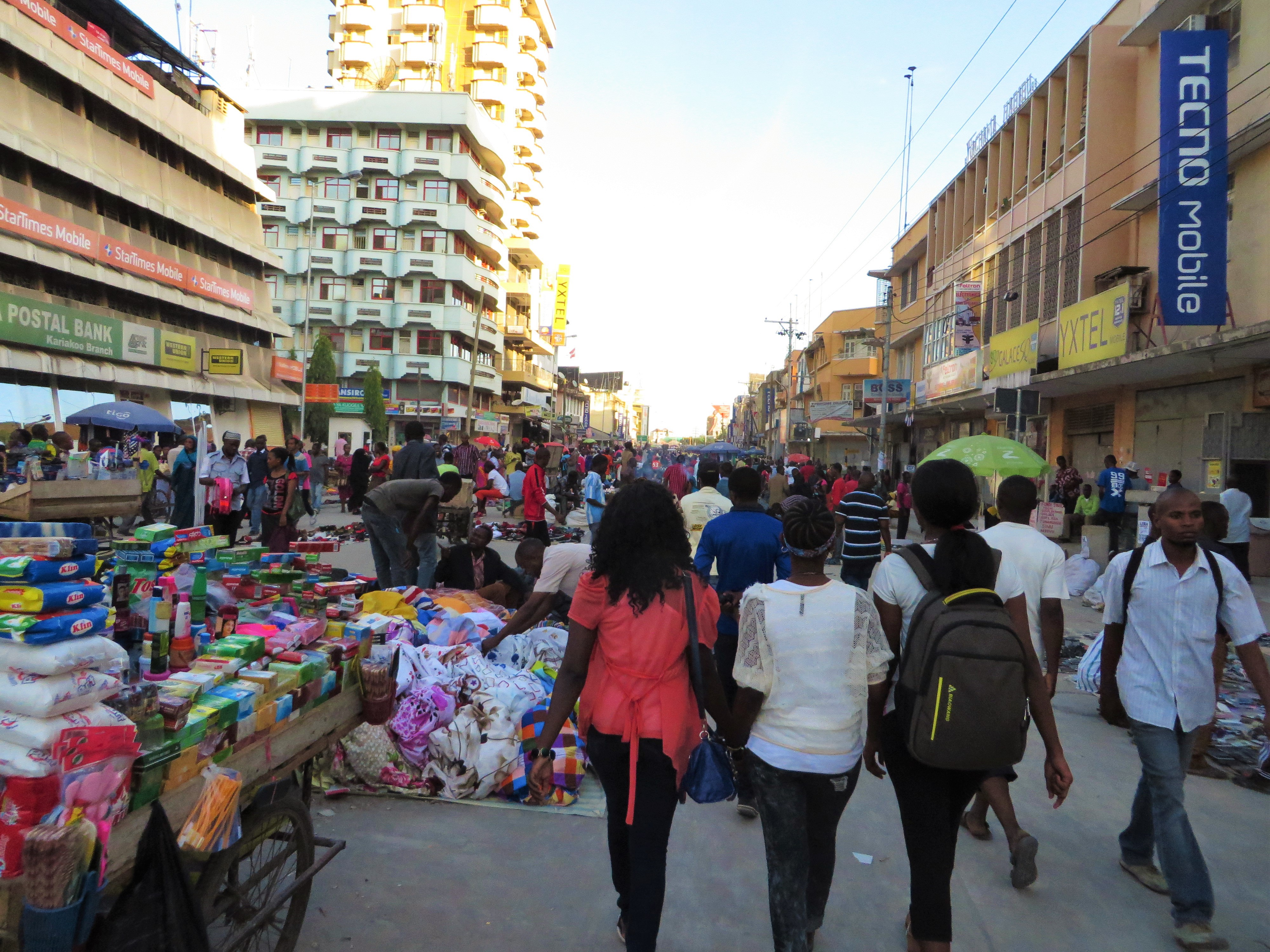
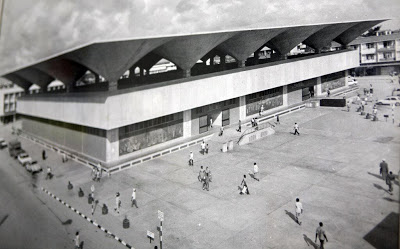
- From top to bottom: Street view of Kariakoo ward, The iconic Kariakoo Market Building in the 1970s
- Interactive map of Kariakoo
- Coordinates: 6°49′10.92″S 39°16′22.8″E
- Country: Tanzania
- Region: Dar es Salaam Region
- District: Ilala District

Area
  - Total: 0.4 km^{2} (0.15 sq mi)

Population (2022)
  - Total: 10,246

Ethnic groups
  - Settler: Swahili
  - Ancestral: Zaramo
- Tanzanian Postal Code: 11106

Kariakoo (Kata ya Kariakoo, in Swahili) is an administrative ward of the Ilala Municipal Council of the Dar es Salaam Region in Tanzania. Jangwani ward and Mchafukoge ward form the ward's northern and eastern boundaries. The Gerezani and Mchikichini wards border the ward to the south and west respectively. The ward is the home of Simba Sports Club. The name is derived from the swahilization of the British colonial occupation's "Carrier Corps", that used to be based in the area. Today, Kariakoo is mainly known for its large market that spans several city blocks. According to the 2022 census, the ward has a population of 10,246.

== Administration ==
The postal code for the Kariakoo ward is 11106. The ward is divided into the following neighborhoods (Mitaa):

- Kariakoo Kaskazini
- Kariakoo Magharibi

- Kariakoo Mashariki

=== Government ===
The ward, like every other ward in the country, has local government offices based on the population served.The Kariakoo Ward administration building houses a court as per the Ward Tribunal Act of 1988, including other vital departments for the administration the ward. The ward has the following administration offices:

- Kariakoo Ward Police Station located in Karume neighborhood
- Kariakoo Ward Government Office (Afisa Mtendaji) in Shariff Shamba Neighborhood
- Kariakoo Ward Tribunal (Baraza La Kata) is a Department inside Ward Government Office

In the local government system of Tanzania, the ward is the smallest democratic unit. Each ward is composed of a committee of eight elected council members which include a chairperson, one salaried officer (with no voting rights), and an executive officer. One-third of seats are reserved for women councillors.

== Demographics ==
The ward serves as the Zaramo people's ancestral home, along with much of the district. As the city developed throughout time, the ward became into a cosmopolitan ward. In total, 13,780 people called the ward home in 2012.

== History ==
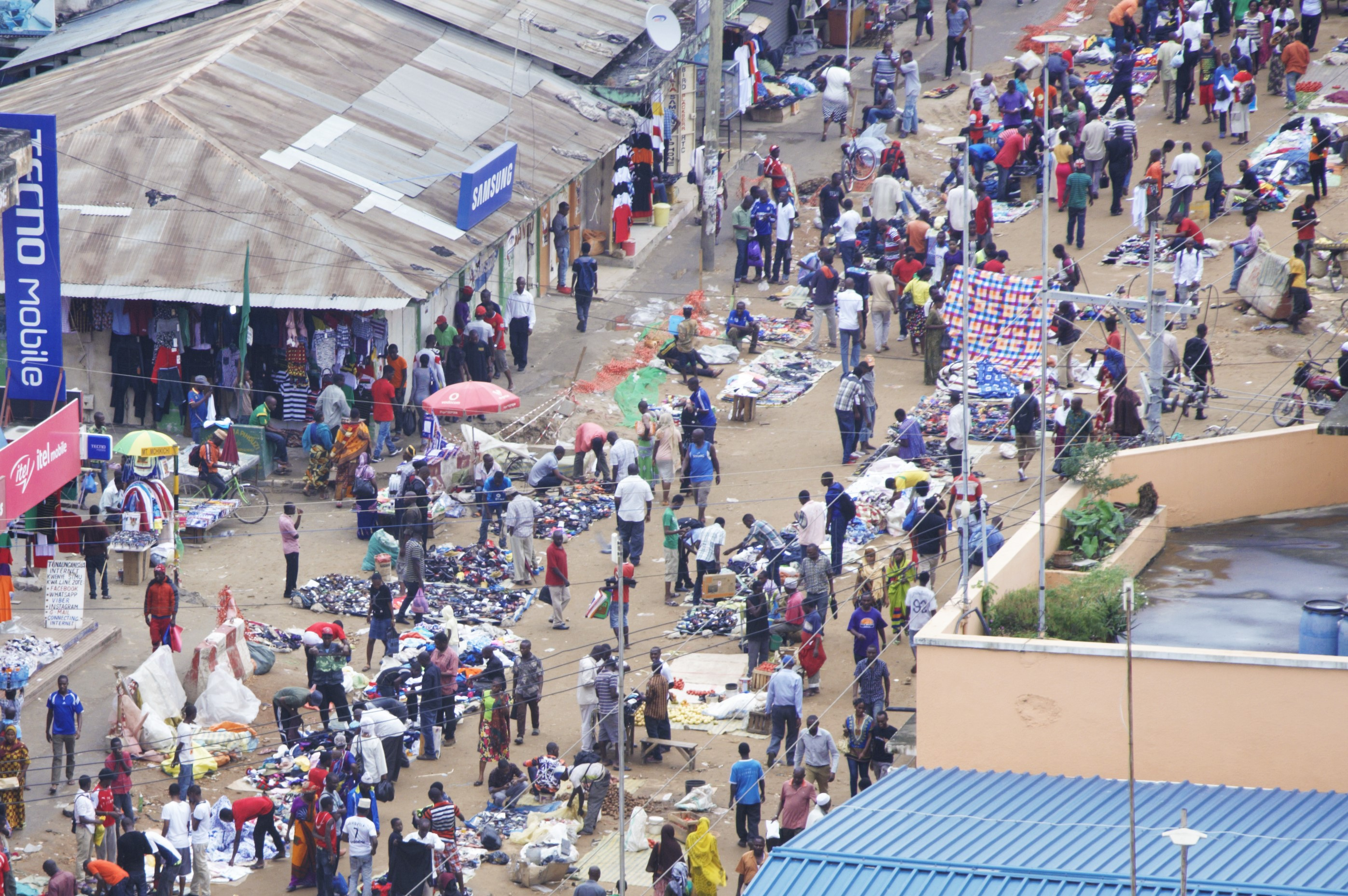
An aerial view of the Kariakoo market in Dar es Salaam.

In pre-colonial times there was a large village in the area now known as Kariakoo. This village was frequently raided by slave traders. In the latter half of the 19th century, the area became a shamba (farm) belonging to the Sultan of Zanzibar. During German rule, 200 hectares of the shamba were bought by a German businessman named Schoeller, who rented the land to the Africans. At the same time, Dar es Salaam began to grow, and while Europeans built their houses in exclusive areas such as Oyster Bay, Kariakoo became Dar's main African settlement. In 1913, 15.000 out of the total 24.000 African inhabitants of Dar lived in Kariakoo.

In 1914 the German administration bought Kariakoo from Schoeller, with the intent of creating a formal African township according to the general segregationist strategy being applied German East Africa. Concrete houses were built to accommodate the African population, and at that same time the market was established; yet, the advent of First World War delayed its actual opening.

In 1916 the British conquered Dar es Salaam, and Kariakoo was used as a base for the Carrier Corps.In 1923 the market built by the Germans finally began to function. In the 1970s it was substantially restructured.

== Economy ==
Kariakoo hosts an extensive market which is a major contribution to Dar es Salaam's economy. The market is located on 67 Swahili Street. Kariakoo also hosts the Tanzania Postal Bank on Msimbazi Street. Kariakoo is served by the Kamata Train Station located on Msimbazi Street just outside of the ward.Kariakoo has good transport links due to the Dar es Salaam bus rapid transit service offered just outside of the ward.

== Kariakoo market ==
It is the busiest and the biggest market that contributes substantially to Dar es Salaam's food provision as well as a small-scale economy. Until recently Kariakoo was also one of the main dala dala "stations" in Dar es Salaam, although this has now been moved to south east of Mawasiliano as the Mawasiliano bus terminal.

After a fire caused damage to the market in July 2021, Tanzania's president Samia Suluhu Hassan inaugurated the newly constructed six-storey complex in February 2026. Modern security and fire safety systems, as well as underground parking and a rooftop food court, are all part of the $10 million renovation. President Suluhu stated: "We must ensure that all products sold in this market meet international standards, as before. The products sold in this market will not only be used by Tanzanians, but also by foreigners from neighbouring countries. I urge the Tanzania Bureau of Standards to ensure that the products sold here meet international standards so that the market can be recognised internationally.”

== Education and health ==
=== Education ===
The ward is home to these educational institutions

- Mamilo Vocational College

=== Healthcare ===
The ward is home to the following health institutions:

- Kariakoo Dispensary
- Health Home Dispensary
- Sokoni Dispensary
- Kings Health Center, Kariakoo
- Kariakoo Hospital
