= East Africa Commercial & Logistics Centre =

Coordinates: 6.7924°S 39.2083°E

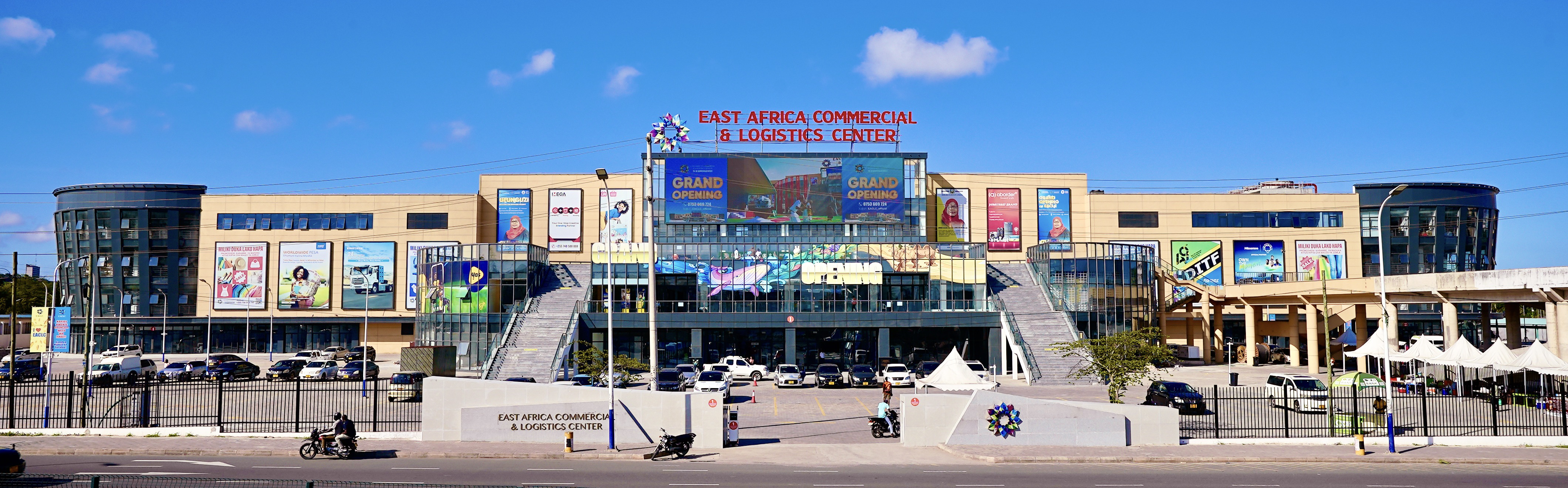
- East Africa Commercial & Logistics Centre, Ubungo, Dar es Salaam
- Interactive map of the East Africa Commercial & Logistics Centre area
- Alternative names: EACLC; 东非商贸物流中心

General information
- Type: Wholesale market and logistics centre
- Location: Ubungo, Dar es Salaam, Tanzania, Morogoro Road, Plot No. P28792, Ubungo, Tanzania
- Inaugurated: 1 August 2025
- Owner: EACLC LIMITED
- Operator: EACLC LIMITED

Technical details
- Floor count: 4
- Floor area: 75,000 m^{2} (810,000 sq ft)
- Lifts/elevators: 6

Other information
- Parking: 1,000 spaces
- Public transit: BRT: DART Mwendokasi (Ubungo Terminal); Bus: Daladala

Website
- www.eaclc.com

The East Africa Commercial & Logistics Centre (EACLC), known in Chinese as 东非商贸物流中心 (Dōngfēi Shāngmào Wùliú Zhōngxīn), is a wholesale market and logistics centre located in Ubungo, Dar es Salaam, Tanzania, on the site of the former Ubungo Bus Terminal. Built with an investment of US$110 million by Chinese private investors through EACLC LIMITED, it contains 2,060 shops and office units across 75,000 square metres.

== History ==
The EACLC project was initiated by Chinese private investors under the supervision of the Tanzania Investment and Special Economic Zones Authority (TISEZA). Construction began in 2023, during which over 2,000 temporary workers were employed.

The centre was officially inaugurated on 1 August 2025 by Samia Suluhu Hassan, President of Tanzania. At the time of opening, 60 to 70 percent of the commercial units had already been occupied by traders.

== Structure ==
The centre comprises four floors with a total area of 75,000 square metres and 1,000 parking spaces. Ninety-five percent of the commercial units are reserved for Tanzanian traders. Monthly rental rates for units start at one million Tanzanian shillings.

== Services ==
EACLC offers a range of commercial and logistics services, including:

- Bonded storage
- Customs clearance
- E-commerce
- Supply chain finance
- Re-export trade
- Banking and transport services

The centre reduces customs clearance time from seven days to three days.

== Economic impact ==
According to TISEZA, EACLC is projected to create over 15,000 direct jobs and 50,000 indirect jobs. TISEZA Director General Gilead Teri stated: "This development will create thousands of jobs, increase government revenue through taxation, and enhance foreign exchange earnings."

The centre is expected to generate:

- US$8.19 million per year in direct government revenue
- US$150 million per year in foreign exchange earnings
- One billion Tanzanian shillings annually for Ubungo Municipal Council

Prior to its official opening, the centre had already contributed 22 billion Tanzanian shillings (approximately US$8.75 million) to the government treasury.

== Countries served ==
In addition to Tanzania, EACLC serves neighbouring countries in East and Central Africa, including Uganda, Rwanda, Burundi, Zambia, Malawi, Zimbabwe, and the Democratic Republic of the Congo.

== Inauguration ==
President Samia Suluhu Hassan officially opened the centre on 1 August 2025. In her speech she stated: "This facility will be instrumental in promoting exports of locally processed agricultural and other value-added goods."

EACLC Chairperson Wang Xiangyun said at the opening: "When mutual respect, long-term commitment, and shared prosperity guide us, dreams develop, and ideas become infrastructure."

Chinese embassy counsellor Suo Peng described the centre as "the largest of its kind in East and Central Africa."
