= Mchikichini =

Ward of Ilala District, Dar es Salaam Region

Mchikichini Kata ya Mchikichini (Swahili)
- Ward of Ilala District
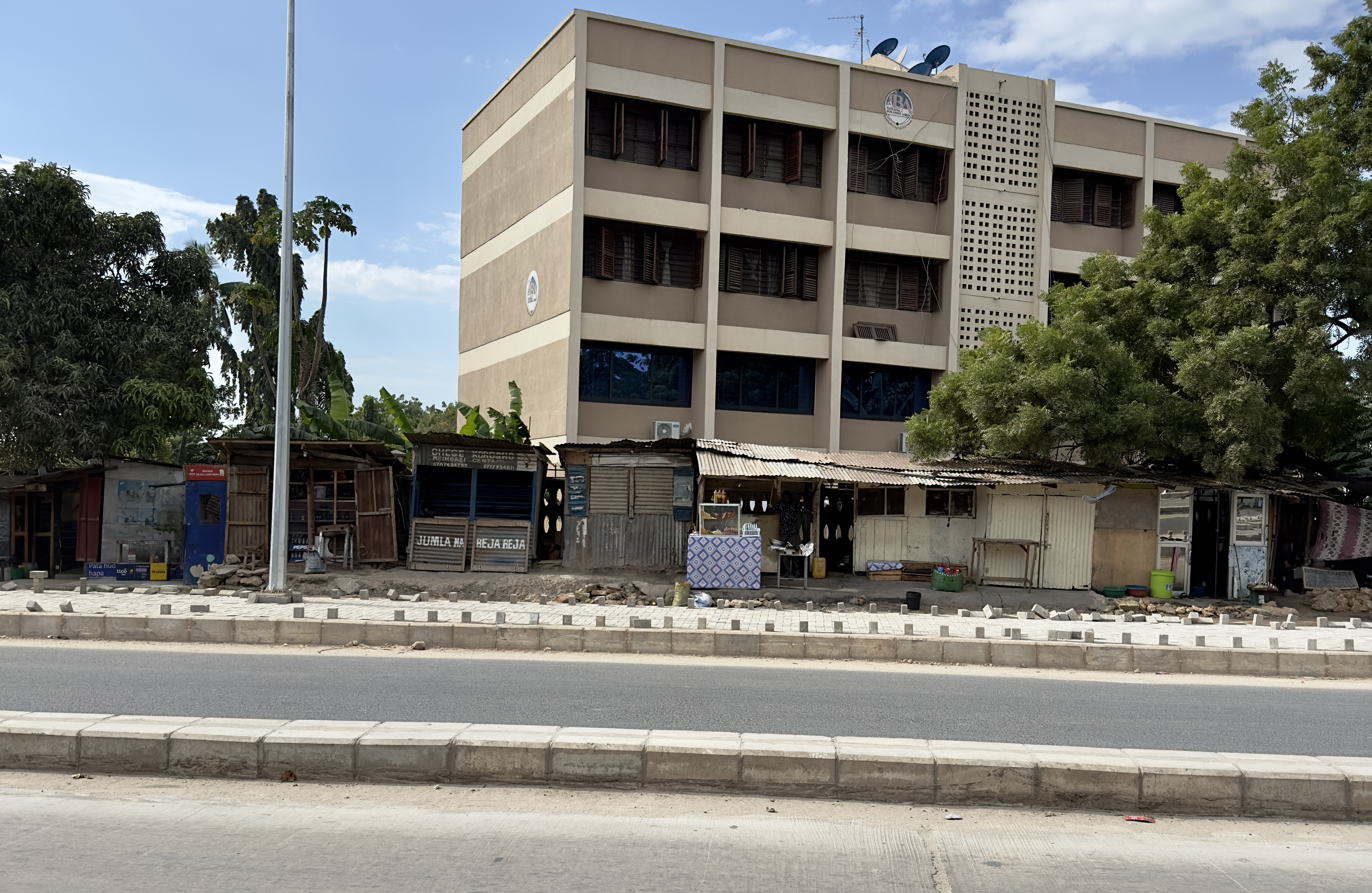
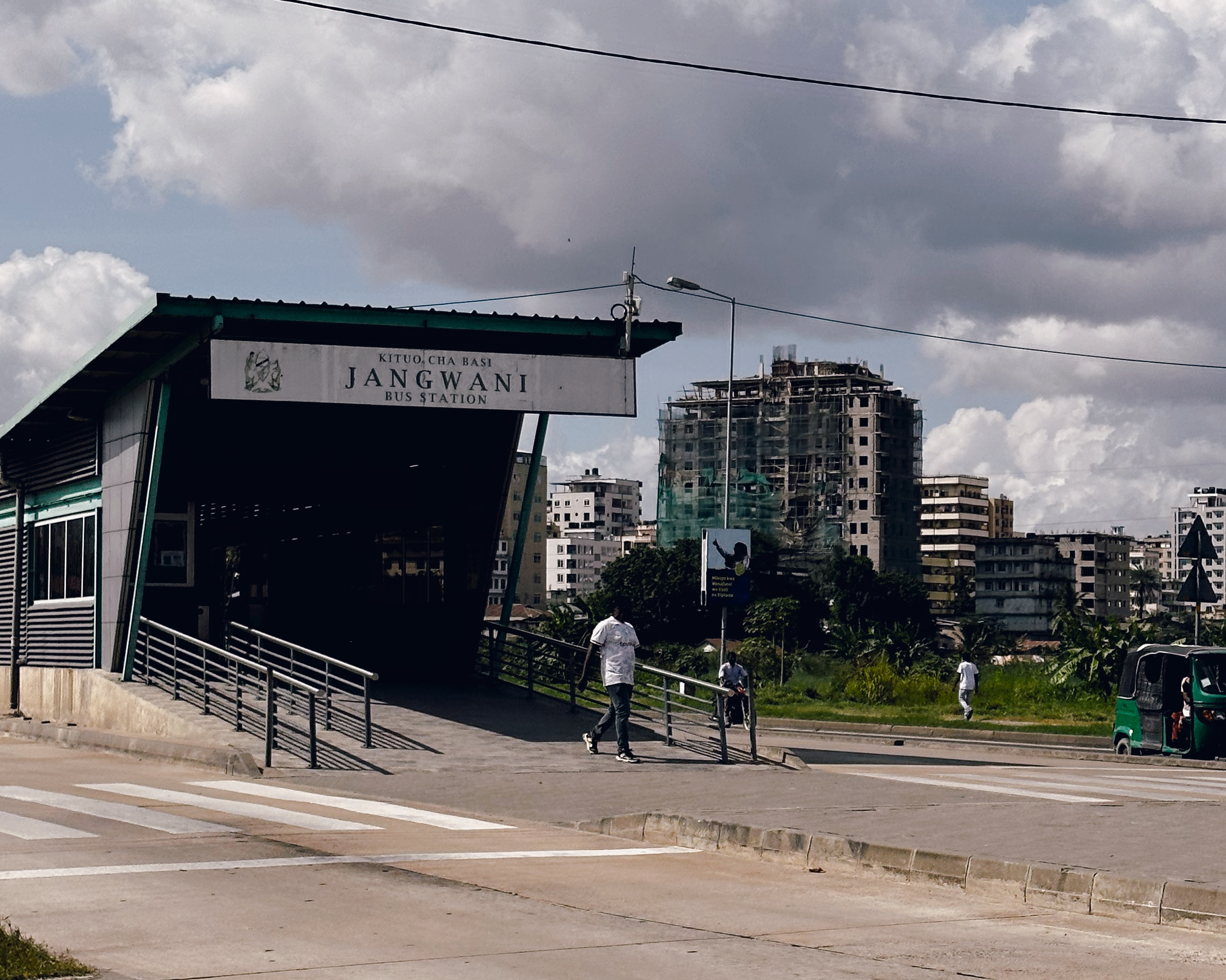
- From top to bottom: Building in Mchikichini ward, Ilala MC & BRT Jangwani in Mchikichini
- Interactive map of Mchikichini
- Coordinates: 6°49′14.88″S 39°15′47.88″E
- Country: Tanzania
- Region: Dar es Salaam Region
- District: Ilala District

Area
  - Total: 1.6 km^{2} (0.62 sq mi)

Population (2012)
  - Total: 25,510

Ethnic groups
  - Settler: Swahili
  - Ancestral: Zaramo
- Tanzanian Postal Code: 11109

Mchikichini (Kata ya Mchikichini, in Swahili) is an administrative ward of the Ilala Municipical Council of the Dar es Salaam Region in Tanzania. Upanga West forms the ward's northern boundary. Its eastern border is formed by Jangwani and Kariakoo. The ward is bordered to the south by the Gerezani and Ilala wards. The Kinondoni District wards of Kigogo, Magomeni, and Mzimuni border it on the west. The ward is home to the Karume Market, one of the largest markets in the city. According to the 2012 census, the ward has a total population of 25,510.

== Administration ==
The postal code for the Mchikichini ward is 11109. The ward is divided into the following neighborhoods (Mitaa):

- Ilala Kota
- Mission Quarter

- Msimbazi Bondeni

=== Government ===
The ward, like every other ward in the country, has local government offices based on the population served.The Mchikichini Ward administration building houses a court as per the Ward Tribunal Act of 1988, including other vital departments for the administration the ward. The ward has the following administration offices:

- Mchikichini Police Station
- Mchikichini Government Office (Afisa Mtendaji)
- Mchikichini Ward Tribunal (Baraza La Kata) is a Department inside Ward Government Office

In the local government system of Tanzania, the ward is the smallest democratic unit. Each ward is composed of a committee of eight elected council members which include a chairperson, one salaried officer (with no voting rights), and an executive officer. One-third of seats are reserved for women councillors.

== Demographics ==
The ward serves as the Zaramo people's ancestral home, along with much of the district. As the city developed throughout time, the ward became into a cosmopolitan ward. In total, 25,510 people called the ward home in 2012.

== Education and health ==
=== Education ===
The ward is home to these educational institutions

- Shaaban Robert Secondary School

=== Healthcare ===
The ward is home to the following health institutions:

- Mchikichini Health Center
