= Keko, Temeke =

Ward of Temeke District, Dar es Salaam Region

Keko Kata ya Keko (Swahili)
- Ward of Temeke District
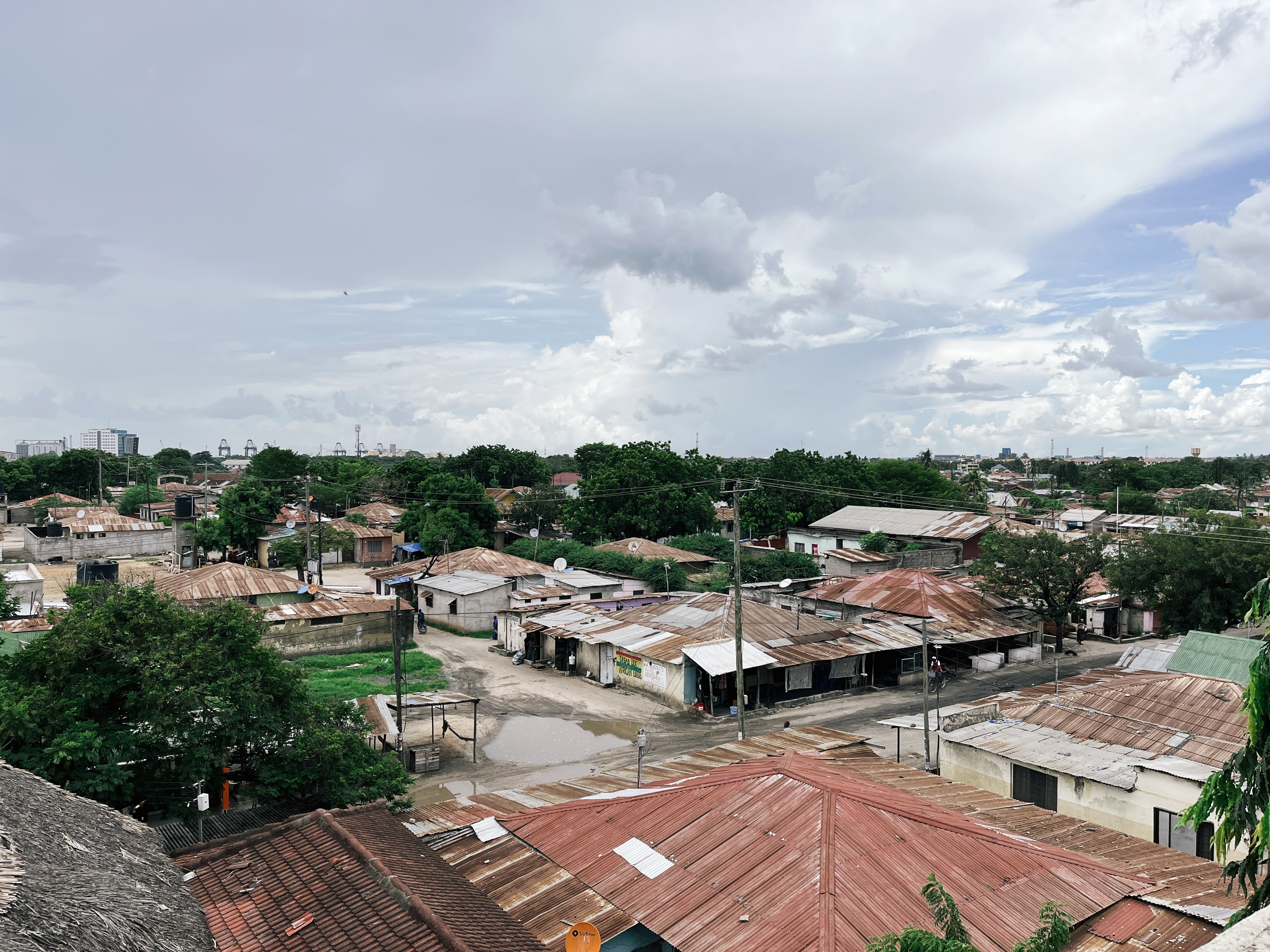
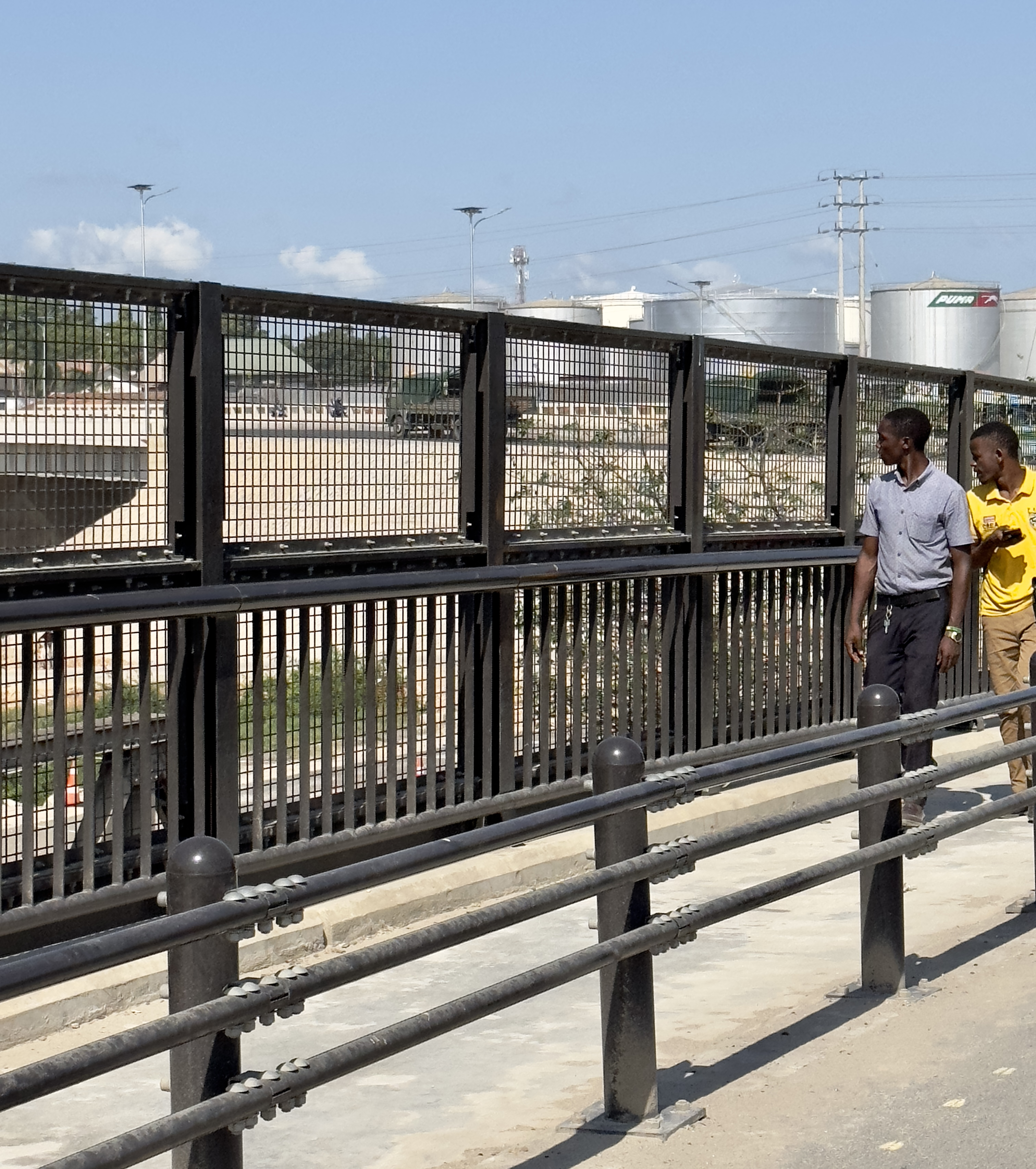
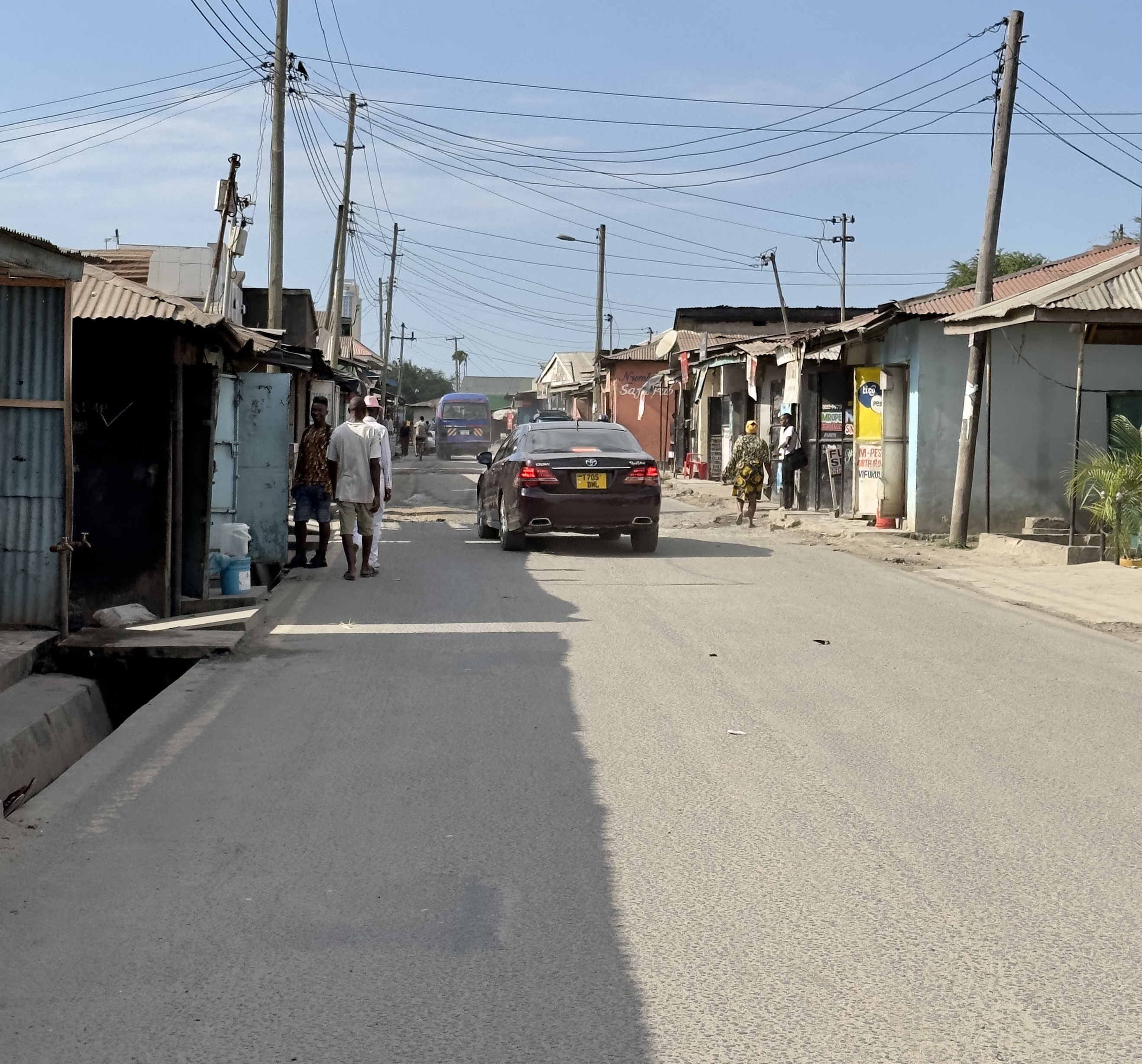
- From top to bottom: Scene in Keko, Gerezani rail Bridge connecting Gerezani ward with Keko ward & Street secene in Keko ward
- Interactive map of Keko
- Coordinates: 6°50′10.68″S 39°16′34.68″E
- Country: Tanzania
- Region: Dar es Salaam Region
- District: Temeke District

Area
  - Total: 1.4 km^{2} (0.54 sq mi)

Population (2012)
  - Total: 35,163

Ethnic groups
  - Settler: Swahili
  - Ancestral: Zaramo
- Tanzanian Postal Code: 15104

Keko (Kata ya Keko , in Swahili) is an administrative ward in the Temeke district of the Dar es Salaam Region of Tanzania. Mchafukoge, Gerezani, and Ilala of the Ilala MC's border the ward on its northern side. Kurasini Ward is to the east of the ward. Miburani ward is in the south. Chang'ombe is to the west. Keko also hosts the largest Vocational Education and Training Authority (VETA) in Temeke District. According to the 2012 census, the ward has a total population of 35,163.

== Administration ==
The postal code for Keko Ward is 15104. The ward is divided into the following neighborhoods (Mitaa):

- Keko "B"
- Keko Magurumbasi "A"
- Keko Magurumbasi "B"

- Keko Mwanga "A"
- Keko Mwanga "B"

=== Government ===
Like every other ward in the country, the ward has local government offices based on the population served. The Keko Ward administration building houses a court as per the Ward Tribunal Act of 1988, including other vital departments for the administration of the ward. The ward has the following administration offices:

- Keko Police Station (Kituo cha Polisi)
- Keko Government Office ( Ofisi ya Afisa Mtendaji wa Kata)
- Keko Tribunal (Baraza La Kata) is a Department inside Ward Government Office

In the local government system of Tanzania, the ward is the smallest democratic unit. Each ward comprises a committee of eight elected council members, including a chairperson, one salaried officer (with no voting rights), and an executive officer. One-third of seats are reserved for women councilors.

== Demographics ==
The ward serves as the Zaramo people's ancestral home, along with much of the district. As the city developed over time, the ward became a cosmopolitan ward with a population of 35,163 as of 2012.

== Education and health ==
=== Education ===
The ward is home to these educational institutions:

- Keko Magurumbasi Primary School
- Keko Secondary School

=== Healthcare ===
The ward is home to the following health institutions:

- Kim Dispensary, Keko
- CPC Charitable Medical Services
- Keko Medical Services
- Huduma Health Center, Keko
