= Chang'ombe =

Ward of Temeke District, Dar es Salaam Region

Chang'ombe Kata ya Chang'ombe (Swahili)
- Ward of Temeke District
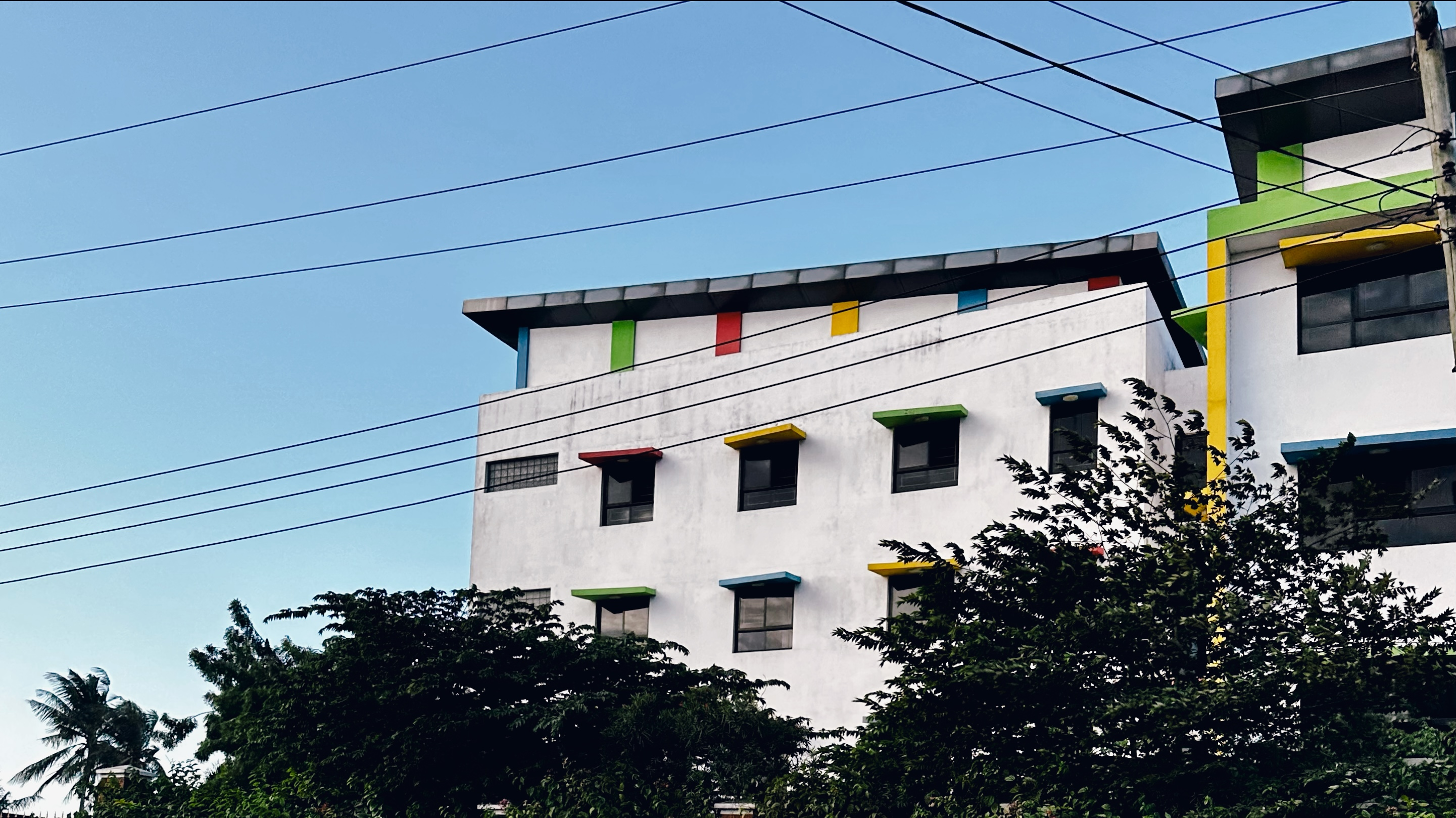
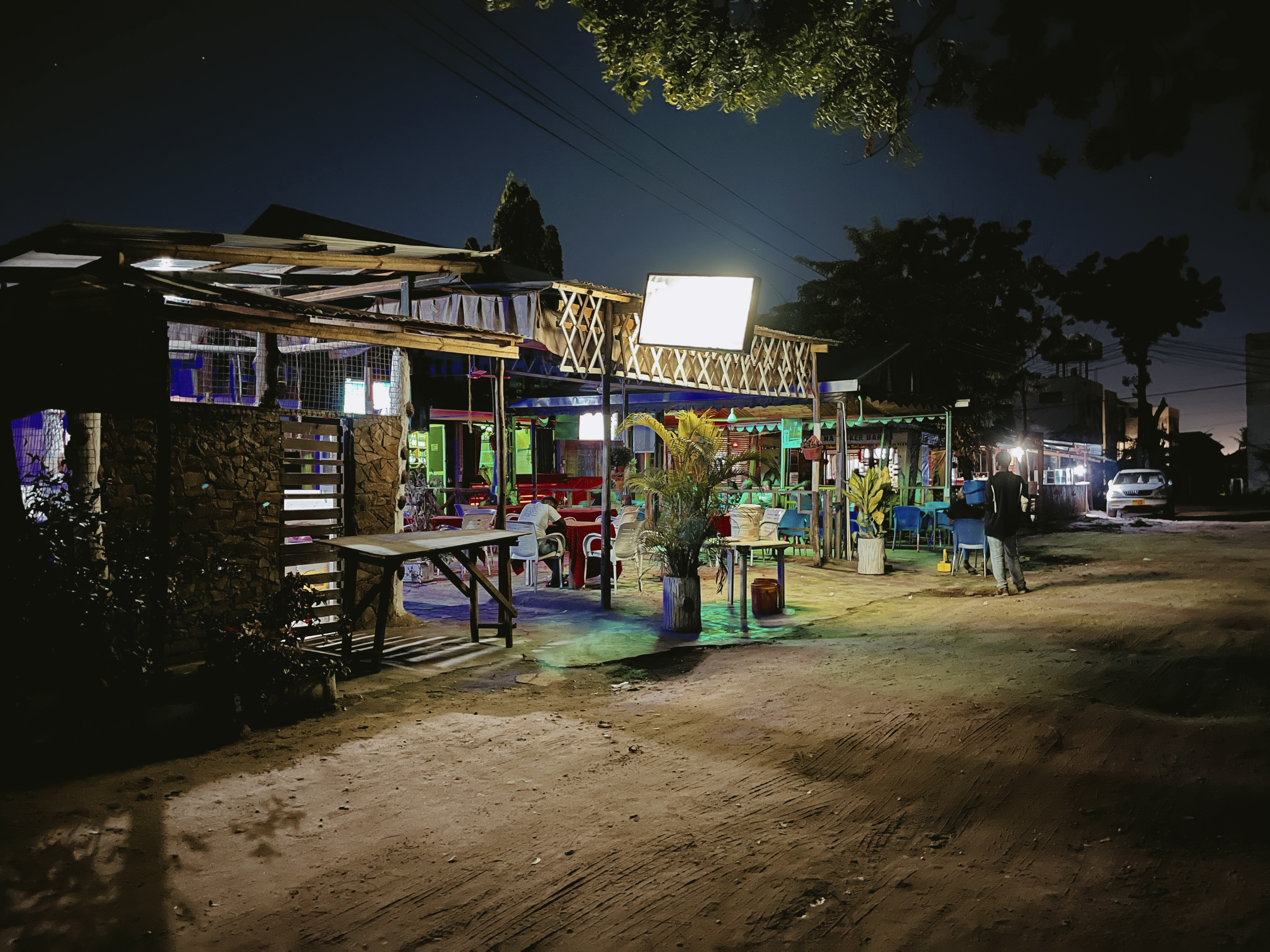
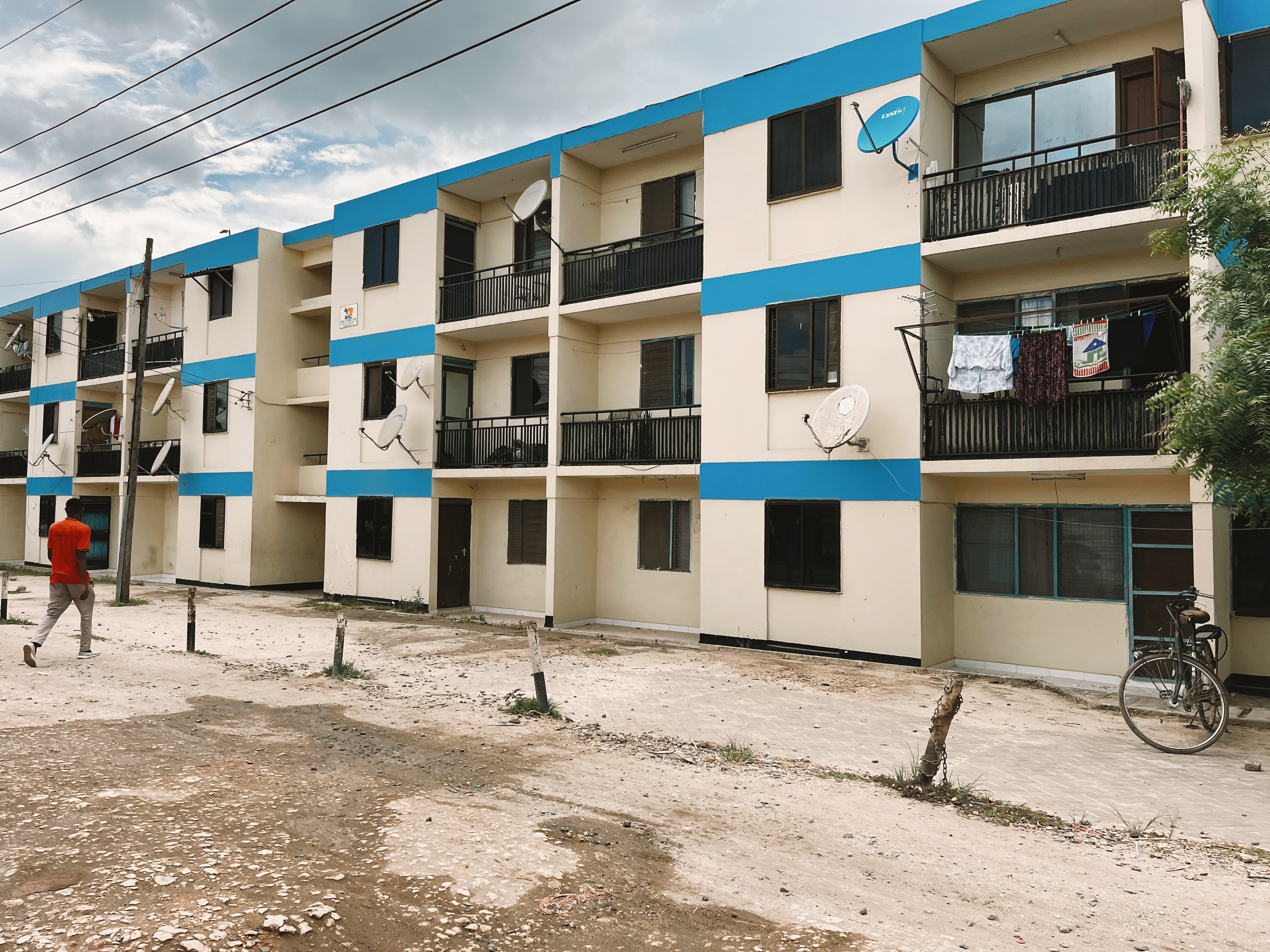
- From top to bottom: Scene in Chamzi outside Azam Complex, Stadium Lights at The Chamazi Stadium in Chamazi & Shops in Chamazi ward
- Interactive map of Chang'ombe
- Coordinates: 6°50′23.64″S 39°15′55.8″E
- Country: Tanzania
- Region: Dar es Salaam Region
- District: Temeke District

Area
  - Total: 3.4 km^{2} (1.3 sq mi)

Population (2012)
  - Total: 19,302

Ethnic groups
  - Settler: Swahili
  - Ancestral: Zaramo
- Tanzanian Postal Code: 15103

Chang'ombe (Kata ya Chang'ombe , in Swahili) is an administrative ward in the Temeke district of the Dar es Salaam Region of Tanzania. The ward is bordered to the north by the wards of Ilala MC's and Ilala. Keko lies to the east. Miburani is to the south, and Temeke lies to the west. The ward is home to the Chang'ombe Cemetery. According to the 2012 census, the ward has a total population of 63,650.

== Administration ==
The postal code for Chang'ombe Ward is 15103. The ward is divided into the following neighborhoods (Mitaa):

- Bora
- Chang'ombe "A"

- Changombe "B"
- Toroli

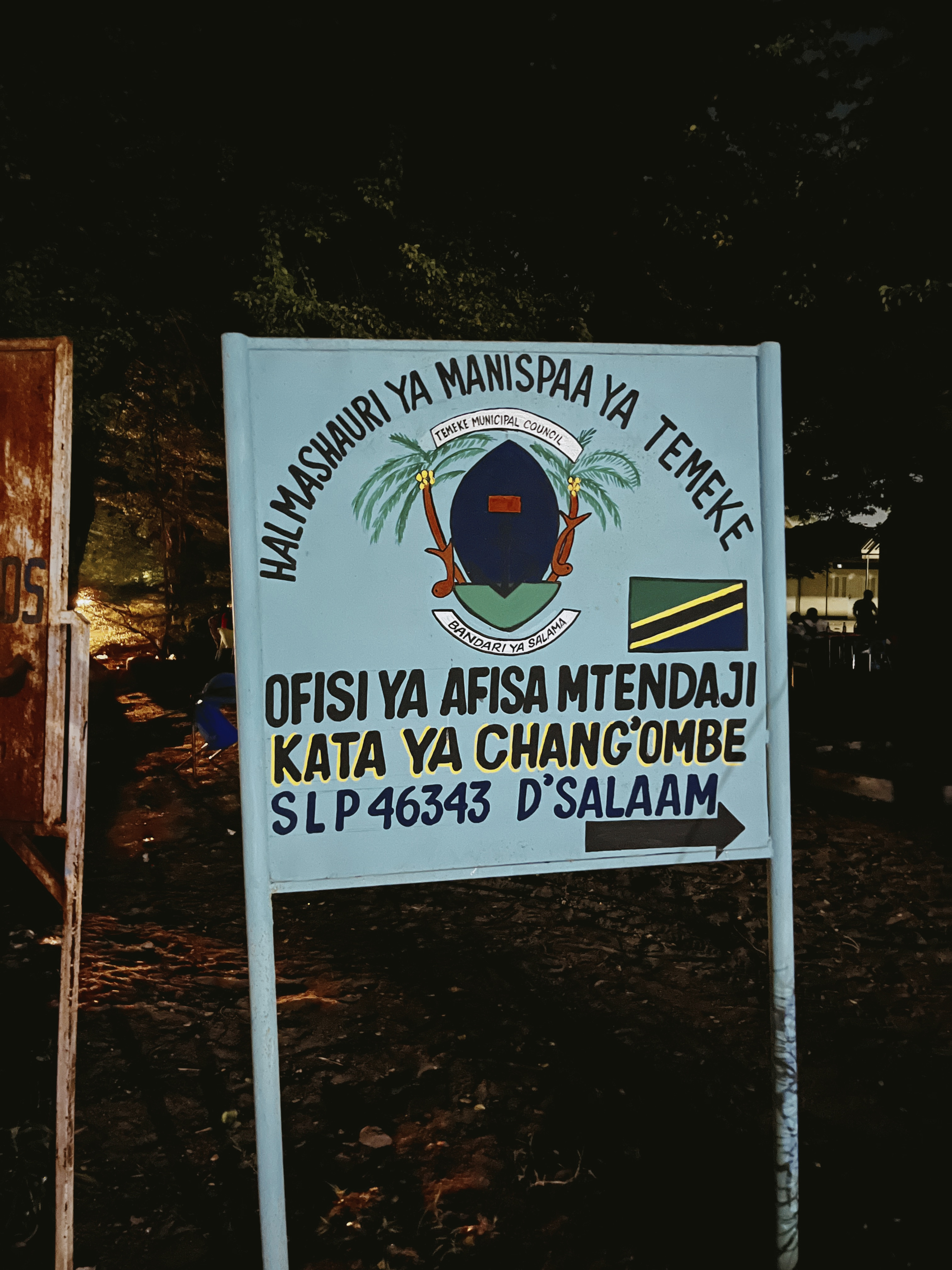
Chang'ombe HQ office, Temeke District

=== Government ===
Like every other ward in the country, the ward has local government offices based on the population served. The Chang'ombe Ward administration building houses a court as per the Ward Tribunal Act of 1988, including other vital departments for the administration of the ward. The ward has the following administration offices:

- Chang'ombe Police Station (Kituo cha Polisi)
- Chang'ombe Government Office ( Ofisi ya Afisa Mtendaji wa Kata)
- Chang'ombe Tribunal (Baraza La Kata) is a Department inside Ward Government Office

In the local government system of Tanzania, the ward is the smallest democratic unit. Each ward comprises a committee of eight elected council members, including a chairperson, one salaried officer (with no voting rights), and an executive officer. One-third of seats are reserved for women councilors.

== Demographics ==
The ward serves as the Zaramo people's ancestral home, along with much of the district. As the city developed over time, the ward became a cosmopolitan ward with a population of 19,302 as of 2012.

== Education and health ==
=== Education ===
The ward is home to these educational institutions:

- Yemen Secondary School, Chang'ombe

=== Healthcare ===
The ward is home to the following health institutions:

- St. Francis Health Center, Chang'ombe
- Hafford Hospital, Chang'ombe
