= Miburani =

Ward of Temeke District, Dar es Salaam Region

Miburani Kata ya Miburani (Swahili)
- Ward of Temeke District
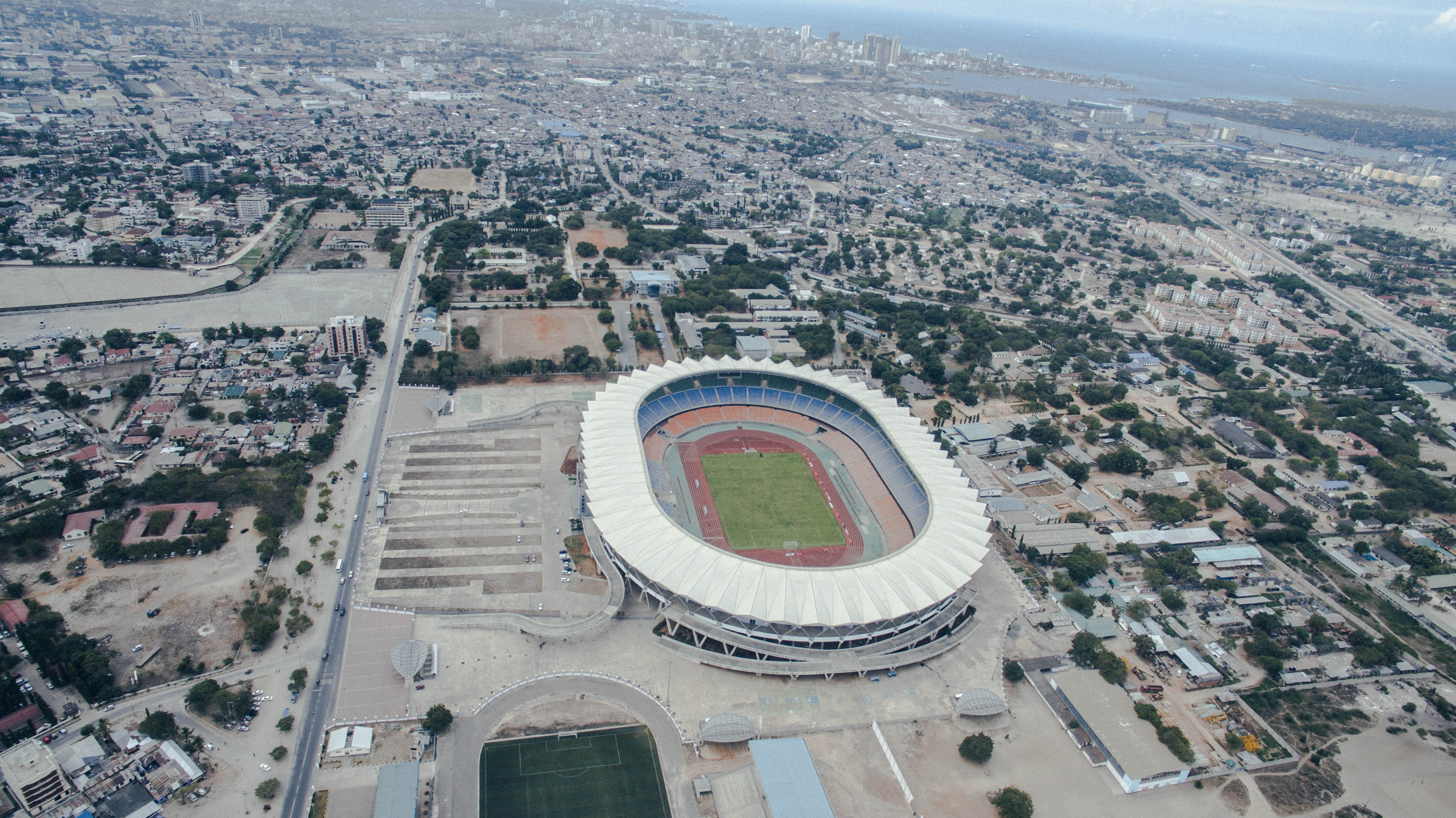
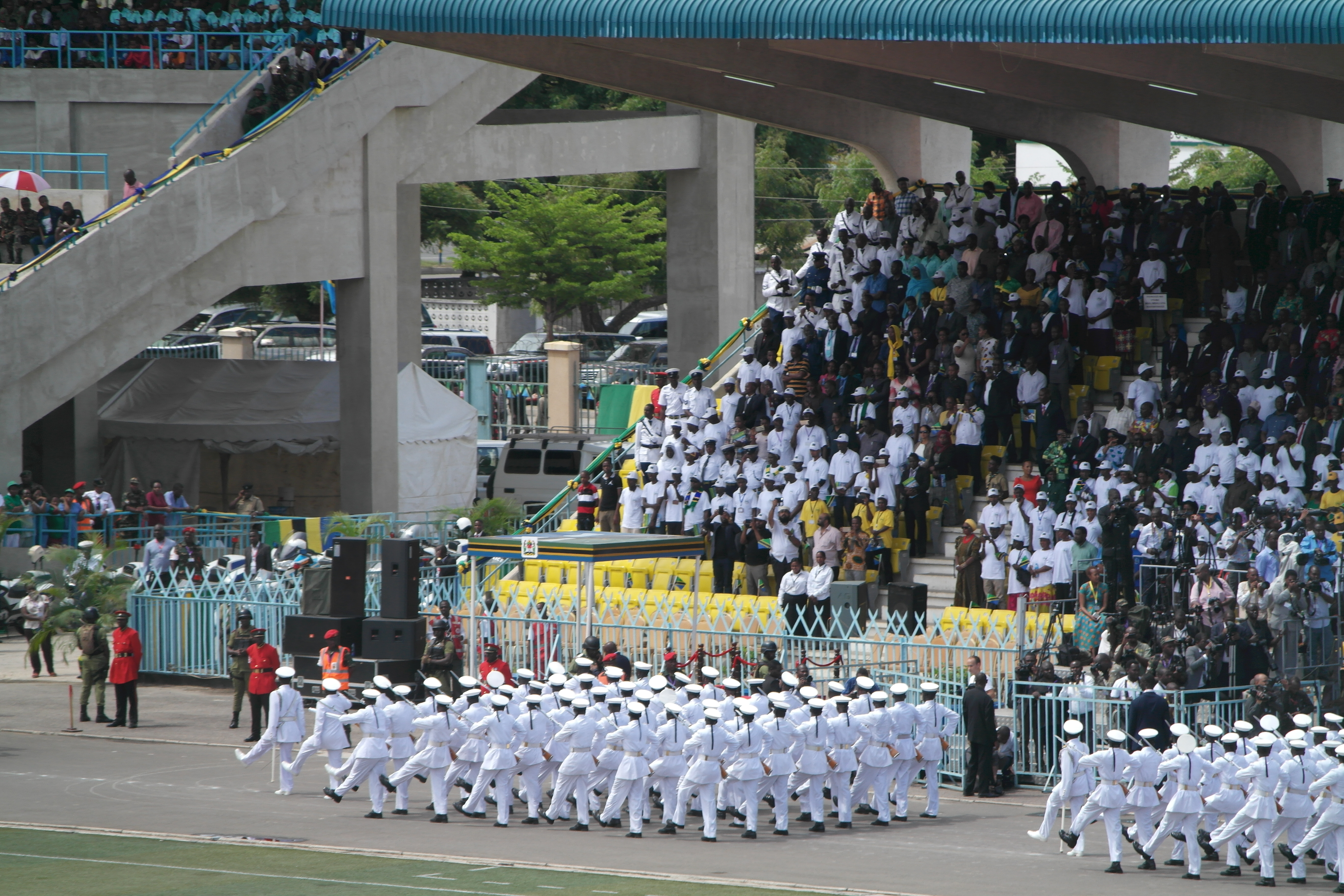
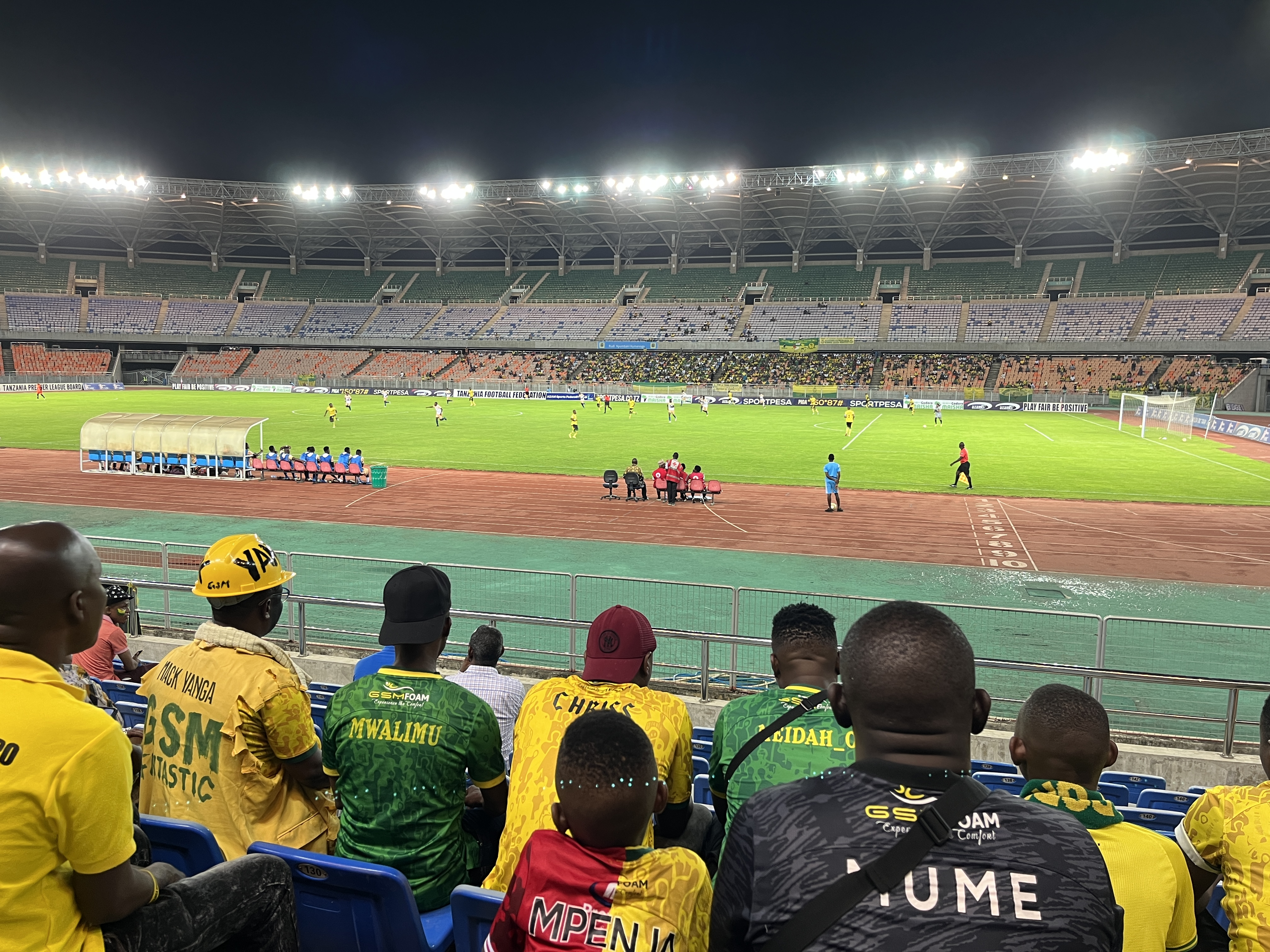
- From top to bottom: National Stadium in Miburani ward, Inside of the National stadium celebrating Tanzanian independence from Britain & Yanga game at the National Stadium
- Nickname: Tanzania's stage
- Interactive map of Miburani
- Coordinates: 6°50′16.08″S 39°16′12″E
- Country: Tanzania
- Region: Dar es Salaam Region
- District: Temeke District

Area
  - Total: 3.8 km^{2} (1.5 sq mi)

Population (2012)
  - Total: 44,290
- Demonym: Miburanian

Ethnic groups
  - Settler: Swahili
  - Ancestral: Zaramo
- Tanzanian Postal Code: 15105

Miburani (Kata ya Miburani in Swahili) is an administrative ward in the Temeke district of the Dar es Salaam Region of Tanzania. It is the seat of Temeke District. Azimio and Temeke Wards are to the south and west of Miburani, and Chang'ombe, Keko, and Kurasini Wards are to the north and east. The ward is home to the Benjamin Mkapa Stadium and Uhuru Stadium the former being the largest stadium in the country and the latter being the most historic. Miburani also hosts Chang'ombe Cemetery and Chang'ombe Police Station as it was once part of Chang'ombe ward. According to the 2002 census, the ward has a total population of 41,176.

== Administration ==
The postal code for Miburani Ward is 15105. The ward is divided into the following neighborhoods (Mitaa):

- Keko Machungwa
- Mgulani (Keko Juu)
- Miburani, Miburani ward

- Uwanja wa Taifa
- Wailes

=== Government ===
Like every other ward in the country, the ward has local government offices based on the population served. The Miburani Ward administration building houses a court as per the Ward Tribunal Act of 1988, including other vital departments for the administration of the ward. The ward has the following administration offices:

- Miburani Ward Police Station
- Miburani Ward Government Office (Afisa Mtendaji)
- Miburani Ward Tribunal (Baraza La Kata) is a Department inside Ward Government Office

In the local government system of Tanzania, the ward is the smallest democratic unit. Each ward comprises a committee of eight elected council members, including a chairperson, one salaried officer (with no voting rights), and an executive officer. One-third of seats are reserved for women councilors.

== Economy ==
Serving as Temeke's capital, the Muburani ward is home to the JKT army base, The National Stadium, Uhuru Stadium, and many other local government offices such as the Kilwa Road Police housing units and the Temeke Government office. Miburani hosts the Keko machungwa neighborhood known for its vibrant culture and market.

== Demographics ==
The ward serves as the Zaramo people's ancestral home, along with much of the district. As the city developed over time, the ward became a cosmopolitan ward.

== Education and health ==
=== Education ===
The ward is home to these educational institutions:

- Majani ya Chai Primary School
- Jeshi la Wokovu Primary School
- Chang'ombe Pre School
- Taifa Primary School
- Mgulani Primary school
- Jitegemee Secondary School
- Kibasila Secondary School
- Kibasila B Secondary School
- Stamaria Salome Secondary School
- University of Dar es Salaam, College of Education
- College of National Education

=== Healthcare ===
The ward is home to the following health institutions:

- University of Dar es Salaam, College of Education Health Center
- Police Kilwa Road Health Center
