= Dar es Salaam Rapid Transit =

Public transit system in Tanzania

Dar es Salaam Bus Rapid Transit
- UDA Rapid Transit Public Limited Company logo

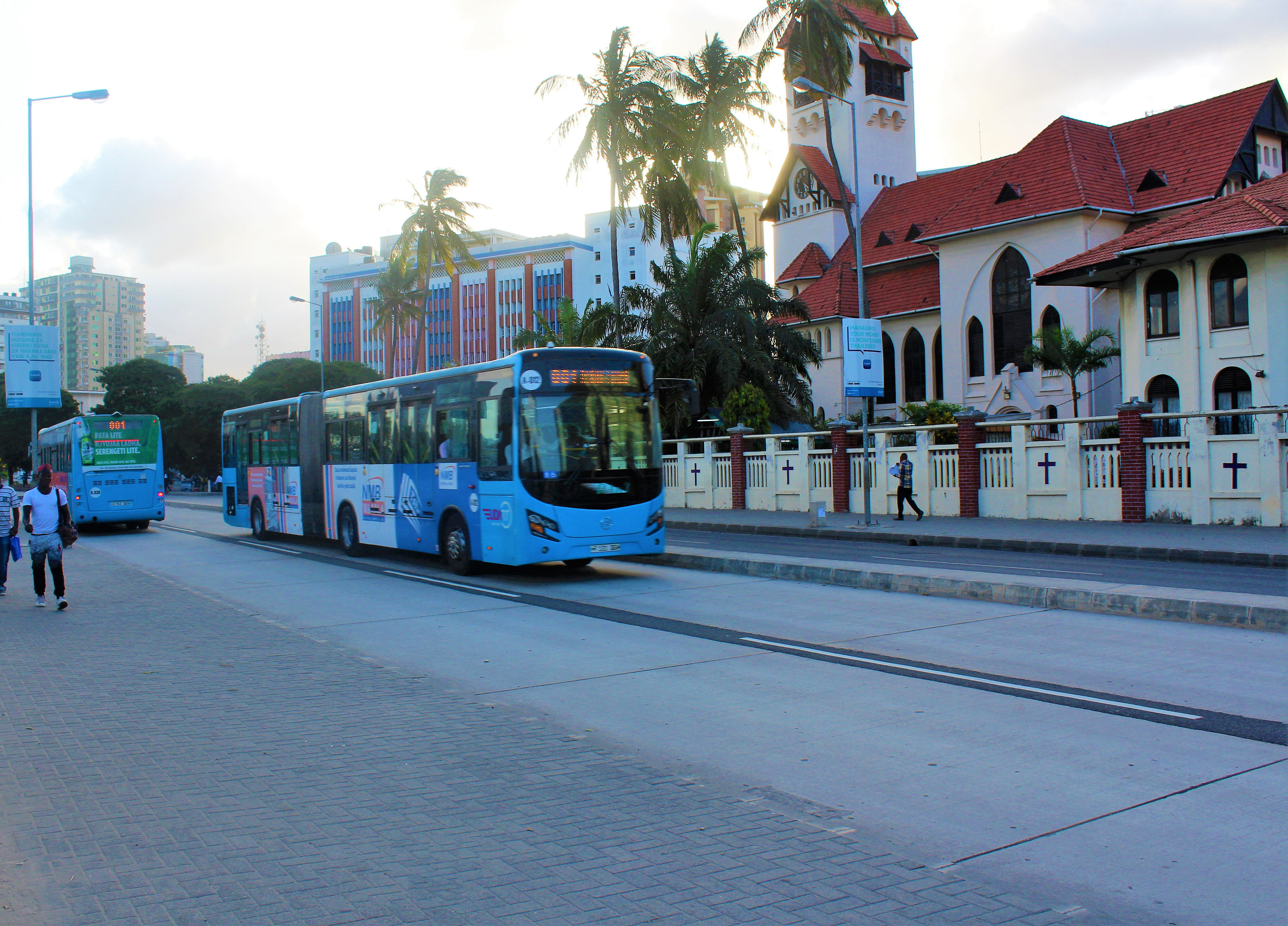

Overview
- Owner: Government of Tanzania
- Locale: Dar es Salaam, Tanzania
- Transit type: Bus rapid transit
- Number of lines: 2
- Number of stations: 54
- Daily ridership: 179,000 (August 2017)
- Website: Company website

Operation
- Began operation: 10 May 2016
- Operator: UDA-RT
- Number of vehicles: 210

Technical
- System length: 41.2 km (25.6 mi)
- Average speed: 23.0 km/h (14.3 mph)

Dar es Salaam Rapid Transit also known as UDART (Swahili: Shirika la Usafiri la Dar es Salaam la Mwendokasi) is a bus rapid transit system that began operations on 10 May 2016 in Dar es Salaam, Tanzania.

== Overview ==
Shirika la Usafiri Dar es Salaam limited (UDA) began operations of UDA Rapid Transit Public Limited Company (UDART) on 10 May 2016. As of August 2017, the UDART fleet of buses carries an average of 179,000 Dar es Salaam commuters daily, serving the local community by providing safe and dependable passenger transportation. The firm was formed in Tanzania under the company legislation on December 19, 2014.

The transit system consists of 6 phases and the construction of the first phase began in April 2012 by the Austrian construction company Strabag International GmbH. Construction of the first phase was completed in December 2015 at a total cost of €134 million funded by the African Development Bank, World Bank and the Government of Tanzania. The first phase of the project has a total length of 21.1 kilometers with dedicated bus lanes on three trunk routes with a total of 29 stations. The first Phase of the system is operated by The Usafiri Dar es salaam Rapid Transit (UDA-RT) under the surveillance of the Land Transport regulatory authority (LATRA) Currently, the route is serviced by a fleet of 140 Chinese built Golden Dragon buses, providing express and local service for over 20 hours daily from 04:30 am to 12:00 midnight. In September 2022, BRT Fleet size had increased to 210.

Phase II operates along the Gerezani–Mbagala corridor through Kilwa Road. Operations are conducted by Mofat Company Limited under a 12-year contract awarded by the Dar Rapid Transit Agency (DART). Passenger services and trial operations began in 2025 using compressed natural gas (CNG) buses.

== History ==
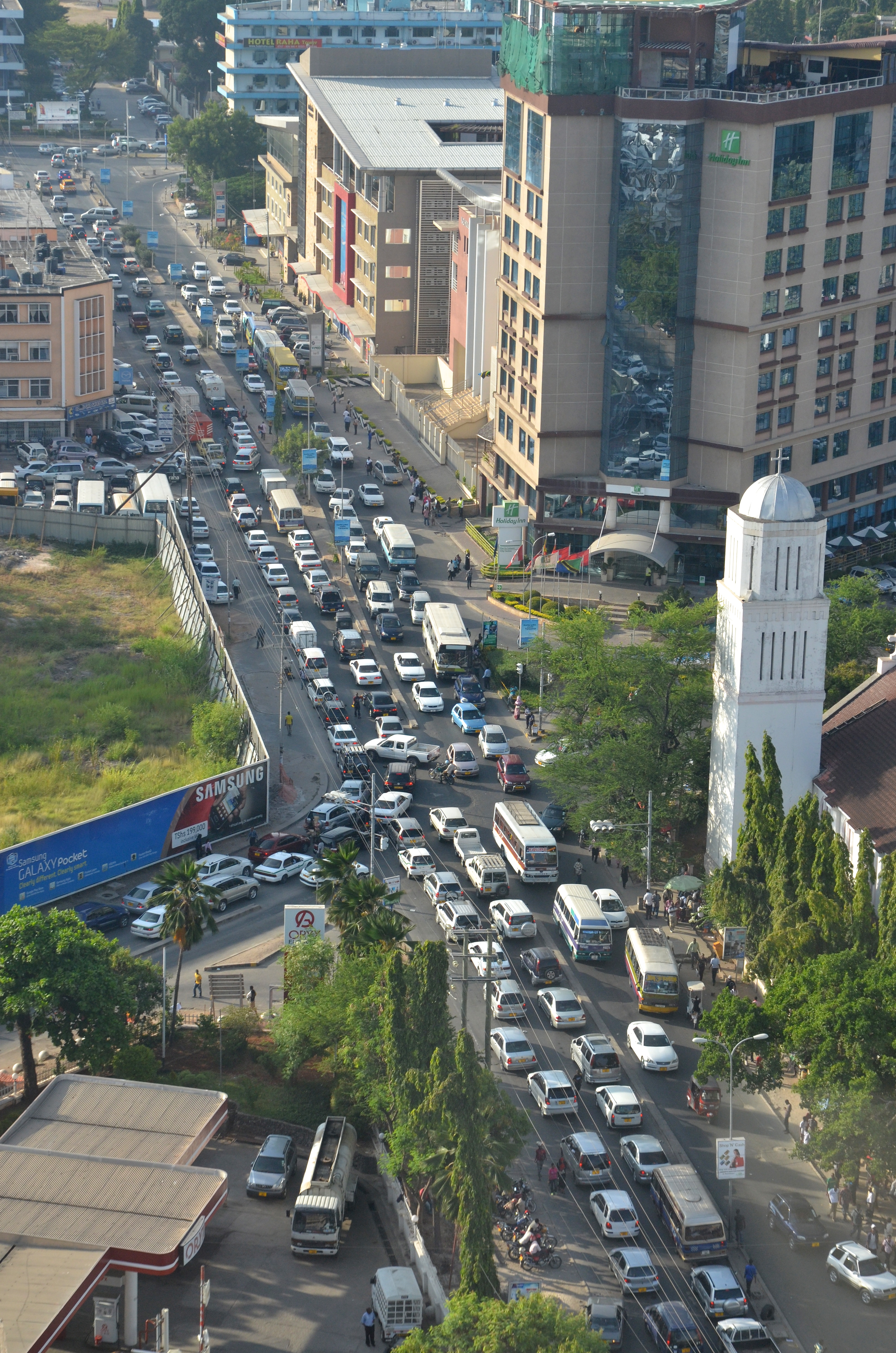
An aerial view of the traffic congestion in Dar es Salaam along Azikiwe avenue before the bus transit system was implemented to provide efficient commuting.

With the rapidly growing population of the city, the government began to draw plans for a rapid transit system in 2003. The government predicted the city population to grow over 5 million by 2015 and invited the Japan International Cooperation Agency to design a master plan for transport in the city in June 2008. A bus rapid transit and a metro transit system were proposed but the metro system was not approved due to the high construction and operational cost involved. The project was placed under the Prime Minister's office and a Dar Rapid Transit Agency (DART) was created through a government notice on 25 May 2007. A 130 km bus rapid transit was planned to cover over 90% of the city's population and the project was split into six phases due to the large investment required. The initial project cost was financed by the world bank and the bank provided $180 million for the construction of the first phase.

== Phases ==
=== Phase I ===
Phase I of the BRT system runs for 21 km from Kimara to Ubungo ending at Kivukoni/Morocco/Gerezani. Construction of the first phase began in April 2012 and was completed in December 2015 by Strabag international GmbH. The route is designed to carry 300,000 commuters daily along 29 stations. The route consists of 21 km of trunk road, 57.9 km of feeder roads, 5 large terminals and 29 stations. The route was placed under interim operations on 24 April 2015 and was fully operational on 10 May 2016, after the fares were decided.

Construction costs for Phase 1
Sub-project	Cost in USD
BRT roadworks	237.2 million
Kivukoni terminal building and feeder station	3.8 million
Utility power relocation	4.2 million
Feeder stations at Shekilango, Urafiki, Magomeni, Fire, Kinondoni A, and Mwinjuma	3.4 million
Ubungo depot, feeder station and up-country bus station	11.0 million
Jangwani Depot	15.2 million
Kariakoo terminal building and feeder station	7.2 million
Improvement of the Ubungo Intersection and Complementary Road Safety Infrastructure for the BRT Phase 1 System	99.9 million
Total	381.9 million

==== Interim Operations ====
On 24 April 2015 the Dar Rapid Transit Agency (DART) signed a contract with UDA-RT for the provision of Interim services of the Dar es salaam Rapid Transit system. UDA-RT is a special purpose company formed by UDA and the two Dala dala Associations, the Dar es Salaam Commuter Bus Owners Association (DARCOBOA) and UWADAR for the provision of interim services. The interim service was conducted to provide training to future operators and build up local capacity. During interim operations the private dala-dalas were still operational on these routes.

=== Phase II ===
Funds for the Second phase were secured in October 2015. The second phase is to run for approximately 19 km from Gerezani to Kawawa south via Kivukoni and is to cost around $160 million. The African Development Bank agreed to fund $141 million for the project, while the remaining funds will come from the government. Construction for the project was due to begin in June 2019 and was intended to take approximately 36 months to complete. Construction of the road will include two flyovers as well. The 20.3 km DART project will commence at Gerezani & City Council BRT station, and include Kilwa Road, Chang’ombe Road, Kawawa Road, Gerezani Street, Sokoine Drive and Bandari Road. As of May 2024 construction on phase II is 100% completed and slated to open in February 2025.

=== Phase III ===
Funding for the 3rd phase was provided by the International Development Association (IDA). The construction will take place from Gongo La Mboto to City Center, including part of Uhuru Road from Tazara all the way to Kariakoo-Gerezani. As of August 2025, construction has hit 90% with an opening date of late 2025.

=== Phase IV ===
Has a length of 30.4 km and consists of three lots. The first starts at Maktaba upto Simu 2000. Lot two goes from Mwenge up to Dawasa and the final lot consists of expansion of the Kivukoni terminal and construction of two depots at Simu 2000 and Mbuyuni. Construction commenced in November 2023 and is set to be completed by May 2025. As of August 2025, construction has hit 30%

=== Phase V ===
Phase five has a length of 25.7 km and starts at the Ubungo Kijazi intersection along Nelson Mandela Road to Nyerere overpass.

== Infrastructure ==
=== Stations ===
There are three types of stations along the route depending on its location and utility:

- Terminals: Terminals are located at the start and end stations for all trunk roads. The Terminals allow transfers between feeder services (Dala dala minibus routes) as well as providing access to various transportation services such as regional buses, private vehicles and ferries. Terminals also contain parking lots to allow commuters to leave their cars during the day.
- Trunk Stations: These are the main stations along the trunk routes which are located in the middle of the road. They are accessed via pedestrian crossings and the stations are elevated to provide pedestrians safety. There are four types of trunk stations spaced 500 meters apart along the road (A, B, C and D) depending on the passenger demand.

Mwendokasi when turning (2020)

- Feeder Stations: Feeder stations allow passengers to transfer from feeder routes onto trunk stations. There are also connections to ferry service along the waterfront: to Zanzibar at Halmashauri ya Jiji (City Council) station, and to Kigamboni at Kivukoni Terminus.

=== Buses ===
The BRT system operates a fleet of 140 Golden Dragon buses. There are two types of buses operated along the routes, one which is 18 meters long with a carrying capacity of 150 passengers and the other which is 12 meters long with a carrying capacity of 80 passengers. In January, 2022 fleet size increased to 210 after receiving donated buses by the Tanzania Revenue Authority.

== Routes and Stations ==
There are six planned phases that will serve over 90% of the city's population and currently only Phase I is operational. Phase II is under construction.

- Phase I from Kimara along Mororogo, Kawawa and Msimbazi Street ending at Kivukoni and Gerezani: 20.9 km
- Phase II from along Kilwa, Kawawa, Bandari, Sokoine road to Kivukoni : 20.3 km
- Phase III from Gongolamboto to Kivukoni and Gerezani along Nyerere, Bibi Titi, Nkurumah, Azikiwe and Uhuru roads: 23.6 km
- Phase IV from Boko Basihaya along Bagamoyo and Sam Nujoma Road to Kivukoni and Ubungo: 30.1 km
- Phase V from Nyerere bridge (Kigamboni) along Mandela and Tabata Roads to Segerea and Ubungo: 26 km
- Phase VI from Kawe along Old Bagamoyo Road and the extension of BRT Phase I &II to Morocco, Vikindu and Kibaha: 33.5 km

== Awards ==
- 2017 : Institute for Transport and Development Policy : Sustainable Transport Award.
- 2018 : Institute for Transport and Development Policy : Sustainable Transit Global Award.

== See also ==
- Dar es Salaam commuter rail
- List of bus rapid transit systems
