= Ilala, Ilala District =

Ward of the Ilala District in the Dar es Salaam Region of Tanzania

Ilala Kata ya Ilala (Swahili)
- Ward of Ilala District
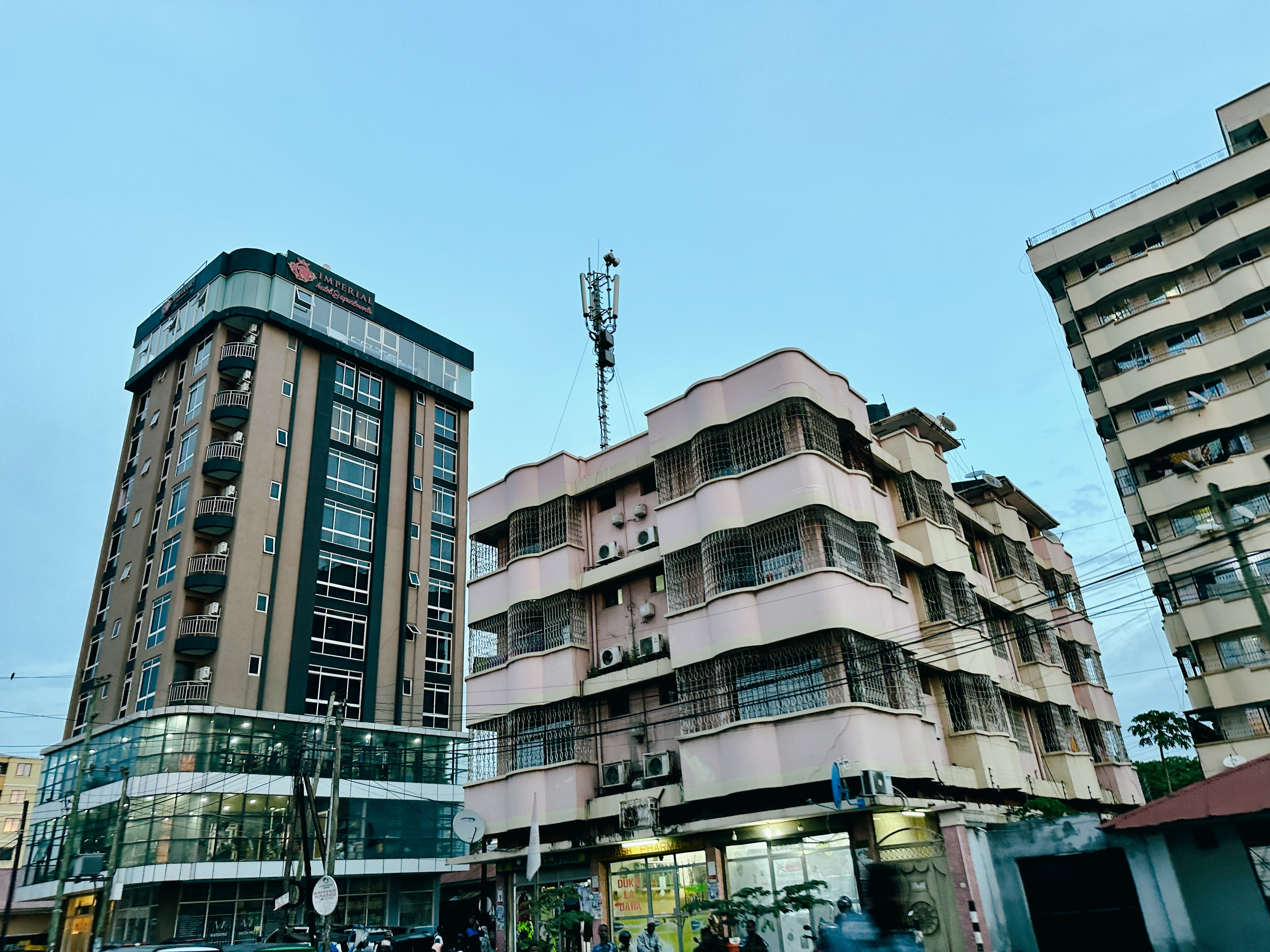
- From top to bottom: NSSF Ilala ward, Ilala District, Dar es Salaam & Uhuru road, Ilala ward, Ilala District, Dar es Salaam

- Location within Tanzania
- Coordinates: 6°49′39.72″S 39°15′34.56″E
- Country: Tanzania
- Region: Dar es Salaam Region
- District: Ilala District

Area
  - Total: 2.126 km^{2} (0.821 sq mi)

Population (2022)
  - Total: 23,787
- Demonym: Ilalan

Ethnic groups
  - Settler: Swahili
  - Ancestral: Zaramo
- Tanzanian Postal Code: 12101

Ilala or Ilala Ward (Kata ya Ilala, in Swahili) is an administrative ward of the Ilala District of the Dar es Salaam Region in Tanzania. The Kigogo ward of the Kinondoni District borders the ward to the north, and the Mchikichini and Gerezani wards to the east. The Temeke District wards of Keko, Chang'ombe, and Temeke border the ward to the south. Buguruni encircles the ward to the west. In 2022, the population of the ward was 23,787.

== Administration ==
The postal code for Ilala Ward is 12101. The ward is divided into the following neighborhoods (Mitaa):

- Amana
- Karume
- Kasulu
- Mafuriko
- Shariff Shamba

=== Government ===
The ward, like every other ward in the country, has local government offices based on the population served.The Ilala Ward administration building houses a court as per the Ward Tribunal Act of 1988, including other vital departments for the administration the ward. The ward has the following administration offices:

- Iala Ward Police Station located in Karume neighborhood
- Ilala Ward Government Office (Afisa Mtendaji, Kata ya Ilala) in Shariff Shamba Neighborhood
- Iala Ward Tribunal (Baraza La Kata) is a Department inside Ward Government Office

In the local government system of Tanzania, the ward is the smallest democratic unit. Each ward is composed of a committee of eight elected council members which include a chairperson, one salaried officer (with no voting rights), and an executive officer. One-third of seats are reserved for women councillors.

== Economy ==
The Ilala Ward is home to one of the country's largest markets, the Ilala Market or "Soko la Ilala". The Karume Memorial Stadium and the Sharif Shamba Public Park are also located in the ward. The ward also houses the National Arts Board, also known as "Baraza la Sanaa la Taifa" (BASATA). Health is one of the most important businesses in the ward, as Amana Referral Hospital established in 1954 and Msimbazi Mission Hospital are located there.

== Demographics ==
Like most of the district, the ward is the ancestral home of the Zaramo people. The ward has evolved into a cosmopolitan region as the city has grown over the years. In 2022, the ward had a total population of 23,787.

== Education and health ==
=== Education ===
The ward is home to these educational institutions:

- Msimbazi Mseto Primary School
- Ilala Primary School
- Ilala Islamic Primary School
- Ilala Islamic Secondary School
- Al-furqaan Primary School
- Msimbazi Secoundary School
- Kasulu Primary School, Ilala

=== Healthcare ===
The ward is home to the following health institutions:

- Pio Specialized Polyclinic (Gongo La Mboto, Mzambarauni)
- Amana Referral Hospital
- Msimbazi Mission Hospital
- Arafa Anne Dispensary
