= Gerezani =

Ward of Ilala District, Dar es Salaam Region

Gerezani Kata ya Gerezani (Swahili)
- Ward of Ilala District
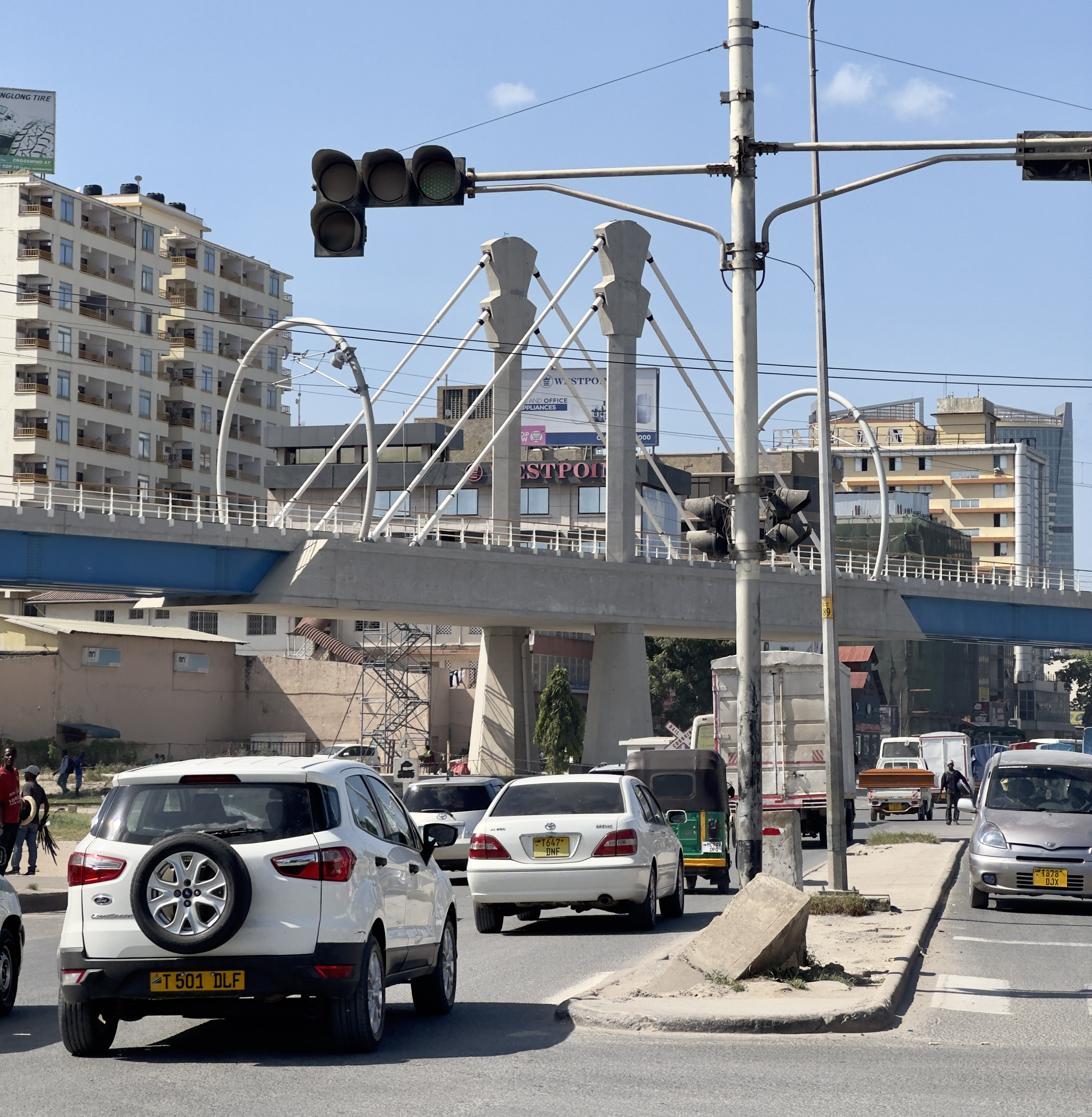
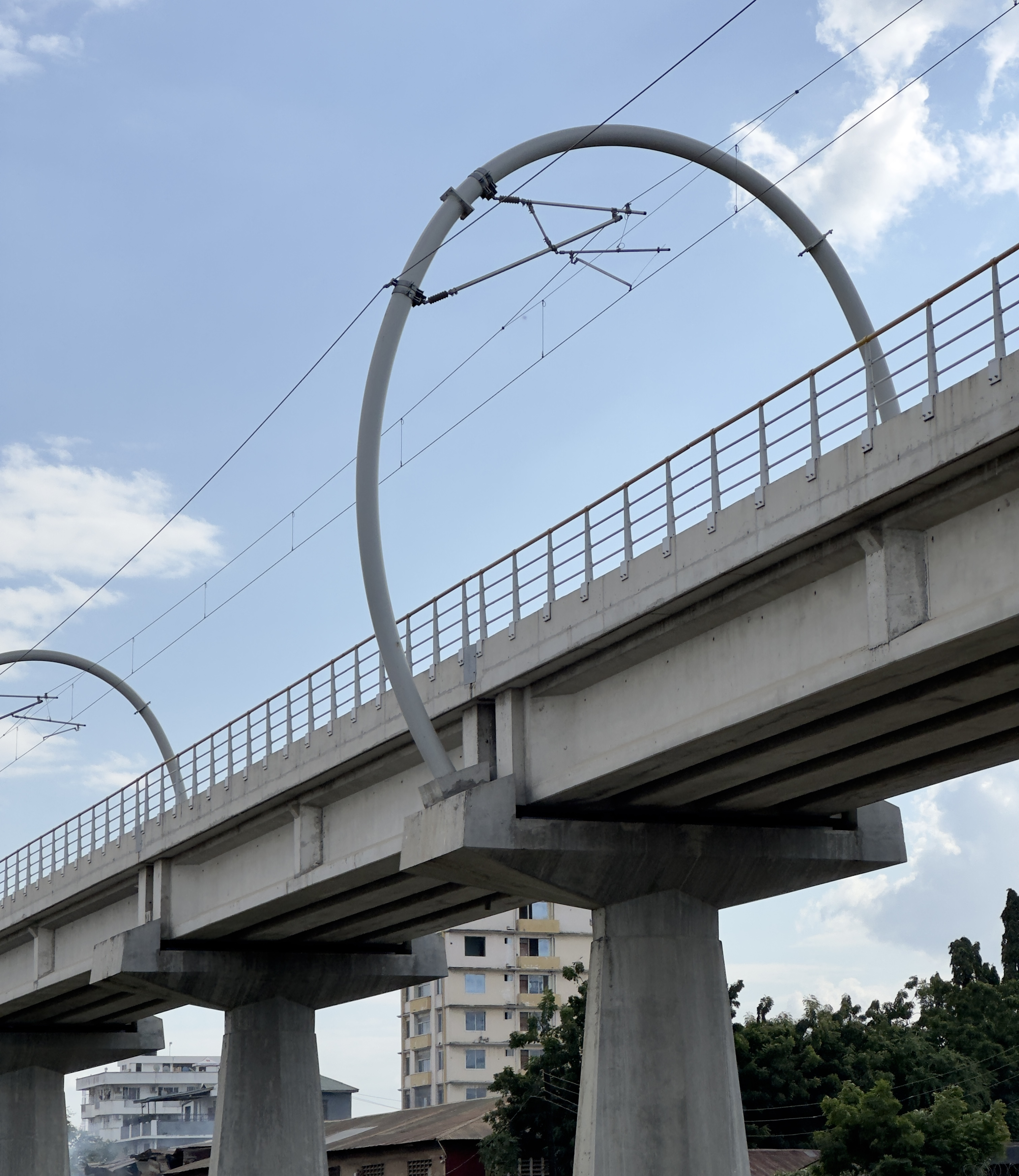
- From top to bottom: streetscape in Gerezani ward, Ilala CBD & SGR overpass in Gerezani ward
- Interactive map of Gerezani
- Coordinates: 6°49′5.88″S 39°17′15″E
- Country: Tanzania
- Region: Dar es Salaam Region
- District: Ilala District

Area
  - Total: 0.8 km^{2} (0.31 sq mi)

Population (2022)
  - Total: 5,786

Ethnic groups
  - Settler: Swahili
  - Ancestral: Zaramo
- Tanzanian Postal Code: 11107

Gerezani (Kata ya Gerezani, in Swahili) is an administrative ward of the Ilala Municipical Council of the Dar es Salaam Region in Tanzania. The Kariakoo and Mchikichini wards border the ward on its northern side. The ward is bordered by Mchafukoge to the east. Ilala ward borders the ward to the west. The ward is bordered to the south by the Keko and Kurasini wards of the Temeke District. Before 1940, the Gerezani ward was constructed for Railways Corporation's White employees. The Mkuki Mall and the Jakaya M. Kiwete Youth Park are located in the Gerezani ward. According to the 2022 census, the ward has a total population of 5,786.

== Administration ==
The postal code for the Gerezani ward is 11107. The ward is divided into the following neighborhoods (Mitaa):

- Gerezani Mashariki
- Gerazani Magharibi

=== Government ===
The ward, like every other ward in the country, has local government offices based on the population served.The Gerezani Ward administration building houses a court as per the Ward Tribunal Act of 1988, including other vital departments for the administration the ward. The ward has the following administration offices:

- Gerezani Ward Police Station located in Karume neighborhood
- Gerezani Ward Government Office (Afisa Mtendaji) in Shariff Shamba Neighborhood
- Gerezani Ward Tribunal (Baraza La Kata) is a Department inside Ward Government Office

In the local government system of Tanzania, the ward is the smallest democratic unit. Each ward is composed of a committee of eight elected council members which include a chairperson, one salaried officer (with no voting rights), and an executive officer. One-third of seats are reserved for women councillors.

== Demographics ==
Like much of the district, the ward is the ancestral home of the Zaramo people. The ward evolved into a cosmopolitan ward as the city progressed over time. 5,786 people lived in the ward as a whole in 2022.

== Education and health ==
=== Education ===
The ward is home to these educational institutions

- Gerezani Primary School
- Dar es Salaam Secondary School
- Al-Haramain Secondary School
- Benjamin Mkapa High School
- Uhuru Mchanganyiko Primary School

=== Healthcare ===
The ward is home to the following health institutions:

- Gerezani Dispensary
- Frontline Dispensary
