= Swahilization =

Swahilization or Swahilisation refers to one of two practices:

- the cultural assimilation of local peoples in Southeast Africa into the Swahili people and their culture.
- the post-independence promotion of the Swahili language by the governments of Southeast African former colonies as a national and official language, alongside a greater cultural assimilation policy of Africanization (see Julius Nyerere and Ujamaa).

Swahili was the language spoken throughout the coastal tribes of Eastern Tanzania before the arrival of the European settlers. During the 1800s, the slave trades led by Arab merchants led Swahili to become a 50% derivative from Arabic.

In the 1960s, the new republic of Tanzania replaced all English education content in elementary schools by Swahili content in a move to erase the colonial past of the country. The middle schools and up were supposed to do the same by the year 2000. Julius Nyerere, who initiated this policy, translated himself Shakespeare's Julius Caesar and The Merchant of Venice in Swahili. This trend was also picked up in the USA, favored by the rise of the Black Power movement.

By the 1990s, the Swahilization of the Tanzanian education system did not really happen, English remaining a dominant academic language, and many reforms were abandoned. In the country's justice courts, trials were led in Swahili but the archives were maintained in English. The mix of Swahili and English in the country's spoken languages was called Kiswengli (Kiswahili-English). On a scholarly level, many scientific words do not exist in the Swahili language. By the 1990s, 8,000 new Swahili technical words were introduced, but ill-spread throughout the academic system. The Swahilization of the country may have isolated it from the international marketplace during the 1970s and 1980s.

By the early 2000s, Kiswahili started to be used intra-group in Kenya, a sign that the country's Swahili-based lingua franca was starting to emerge as a dominant language. 2010 studies have shown that, in Tanzania, Swahili became predominant in the regions that traditionally spoke Matengo.
