= Land Transport Regulatory Authority of Tanzania =

Tanzanian government department for transport

- Mamlaka ya Udhibiti Usafiri Ardhini

Agency overview
- Formed: 2019 (6 years ago)
- Website: https://www.latra.go.tz/

The Land Transport Regulatory Authority of Tanzania (LATRA) is a government agency responsible for regulating and overseeing land transportation in Tanzania. It was established in 2019 by the Land Transport Regulatory Authority Act, which replaced the Surface and Marine Transport Regulatory Authority (SUMATRA).

== History ==
Prior to the establishment of LATRA, land transport regulation in Tanzania was handled by SUMATRA, which was established in 2001 to oversee both land and maritime transports. However, the government of Tanzania recognized the need for a more comprehensive regulatory agency that would oversee all aspects of land transport, and thus LATRA was created in 2019, subsequently marine transport authority was given to another agency called Tanzania Shipping Agencies Corporation (TASAC).

== Functions ==
LATRA's primary role is to regulate and oversee land transport in Tanzania, including buses, trucks, taxis, and motorcycles. Its functions include.

- Issuing licenses and permits to transport operators,
- Setting and enforcing standards for the operation and maintenance of vehicles,
- Monitoring and enforcing compliance with regulations,
- Coordinate land transport safety activities,
- Certify road-worthiness of public service and goods vehicles,
- Facilitate resolution of complaints and disputes.

== Licenses issued ==
The issuance of the following licenses and certifications falls under the responsibility of LATRA.

- Carrier licenses for operators of cargo transportation vehicles.
- Road service licenses for operators of public passenger transportation vehicles.
- Private hire licenses for commercial services involving motorbikes, taxi cabs, and private cars, including traditional means of private hire such as boda boda taxis and car rentals.
- Private hire licenses for ride-hailing and ride-sharing operators and service providers such as Uber and Bolt.
- Certification of train drivers and train crew.
- Certification of drivers and crew for commercial public transportation vehicles.

== Controversies ==
LATRA has faced criticism from some members of the public, particularly transport operators, who argue that the agency's regulations are overly burdensome and that its licensing and permit fees are too high causing some of the operators to suspend or limit their services within the country.
