= Dar Rapid Transit Agency =

Bus rapid transit system in Tanzania

- Wakala wa Usafiri wa Haraka (Swahili)
- Logo

Government agency overview
- Headquarters: Dar es Salaam, Tanzania
- Minister responsible: Hawa Ghasia, State Minister in the PM's Office
- Government agency executive: Asteria L. Mlambo, Chief Executive
- Website: www.dart.go.tz

The Dar Rapid Transit Agency (DART) is an executive agency of Tanzania with the mandate to establish and operate a bus rapid transit system in Dar es Salaam.

Strabag, an Austrian construction company, was awarded the mandate to construct the BRT system in February 2012.
