= Dala dala =

Minibus share taxis in Tanzania

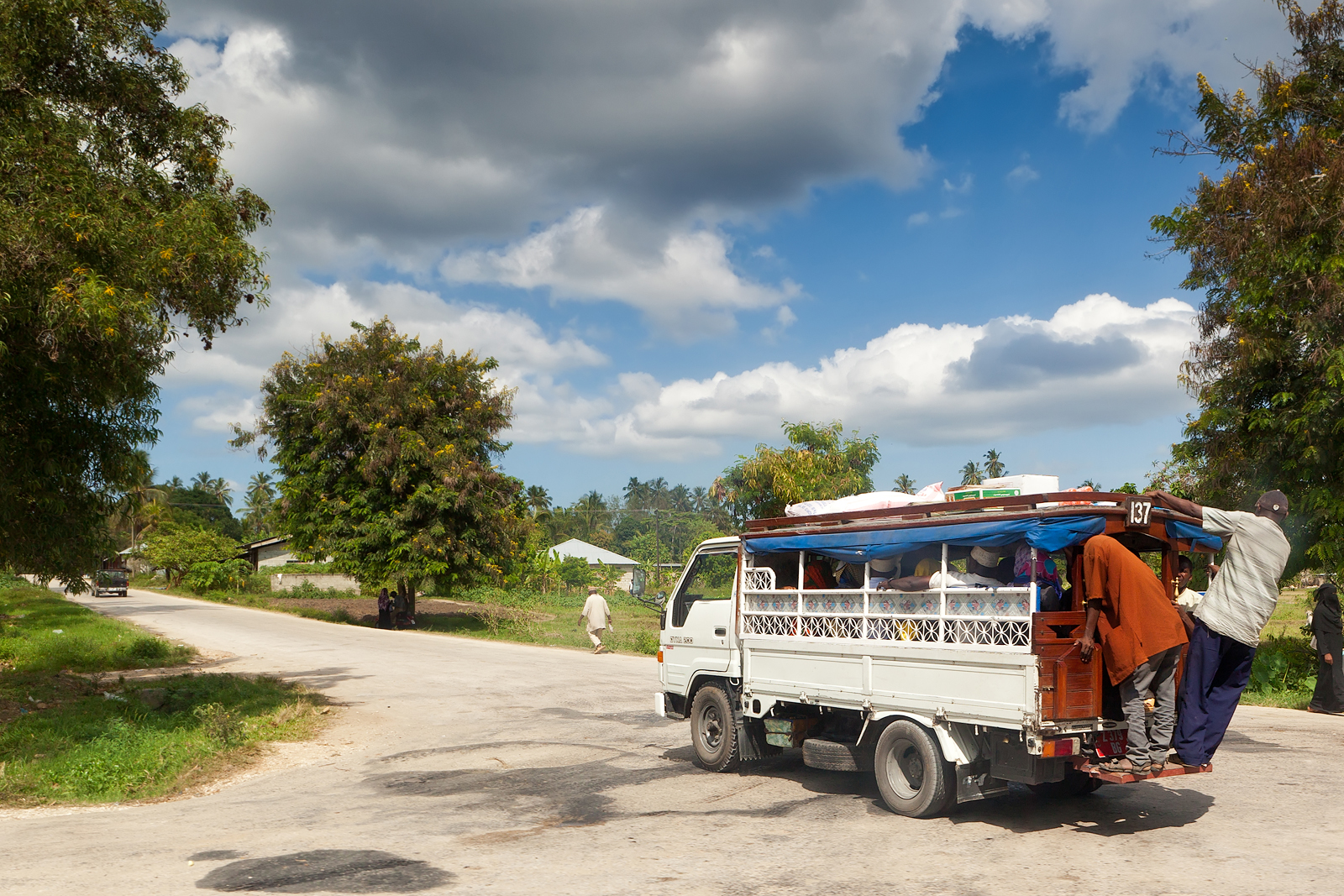
A dala dala on a rural road in Zanzibar

Dala dala are minibus share taxis in Tanzania. These converted trucks and minibuses are the primary public transportation system in the country. While the name originates from the English word "dollar", they are also referred to as thumni.

Before minibuses became widely used, a truck with benches placed in the bed was the typical Tanzanian privately owned public transport. Called chai maharagwe, these were popular and also used to transport and deliver goods along the route, c. 1990.

While dala dala may run fixed routes picking up passengers at central locations, they will also stop anywhere along their route to drop someone off or allow a prospective passenger to board.

In contrast to most of these minibuses, in Dar es Salaam some dala dala are publicly operated as of 2008. (Note: Stuck in Traffic; Urban Transport in Africa (page 9) Ajay Kumar & Fanny Barrett. Africa Infrastructure Country Diagnostic in cooperation with the World Bank, January 2008. Draft Final Report.)

== History in Dar es Salaam ==
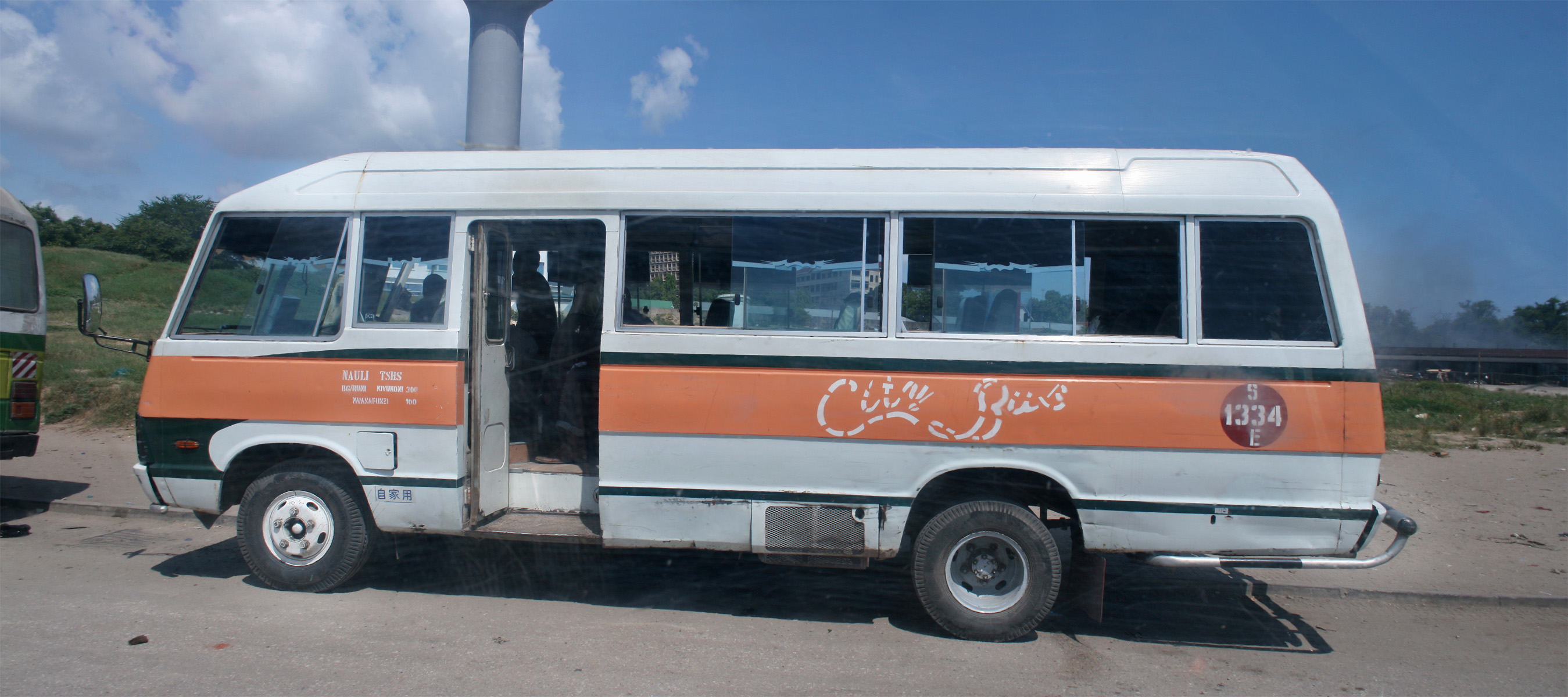
A dala dala in the city of Dar es Salaam, in 2008

The dala dala developed as an illegal taxi in Dar es Salaam, the largest city in Tanzania, due to a deteriorating system of government-run public transport in an environment of rising demand for such services. Between 1975 and 1983, the year dala dala were legalized, the number of buses operating in Dar es Salaam declined by 36% while the population increased by around 80%. In 1983, the government transport company was allowed to subcontract to private entities, but due to high tariffs, this did little to substantially increase the number of licensed dala dala.

Further reforms in the late 1990s caused the number of legal minibuses to swell, and between 1991 and 1998 their numbers rose by 450%. Large amounts of pirate minibuses continued to exist, however, and in 1998 it was estimated that these comprised nearly half of all dala dala in operation. By 1998 dala dala had almost completely superseded government-run public transport; in that year, a total of 12 government-operated buses plied the streets. Around that time there were somewhere between 7,650 and 6,300 dala dala in operation.

== Conductor ==
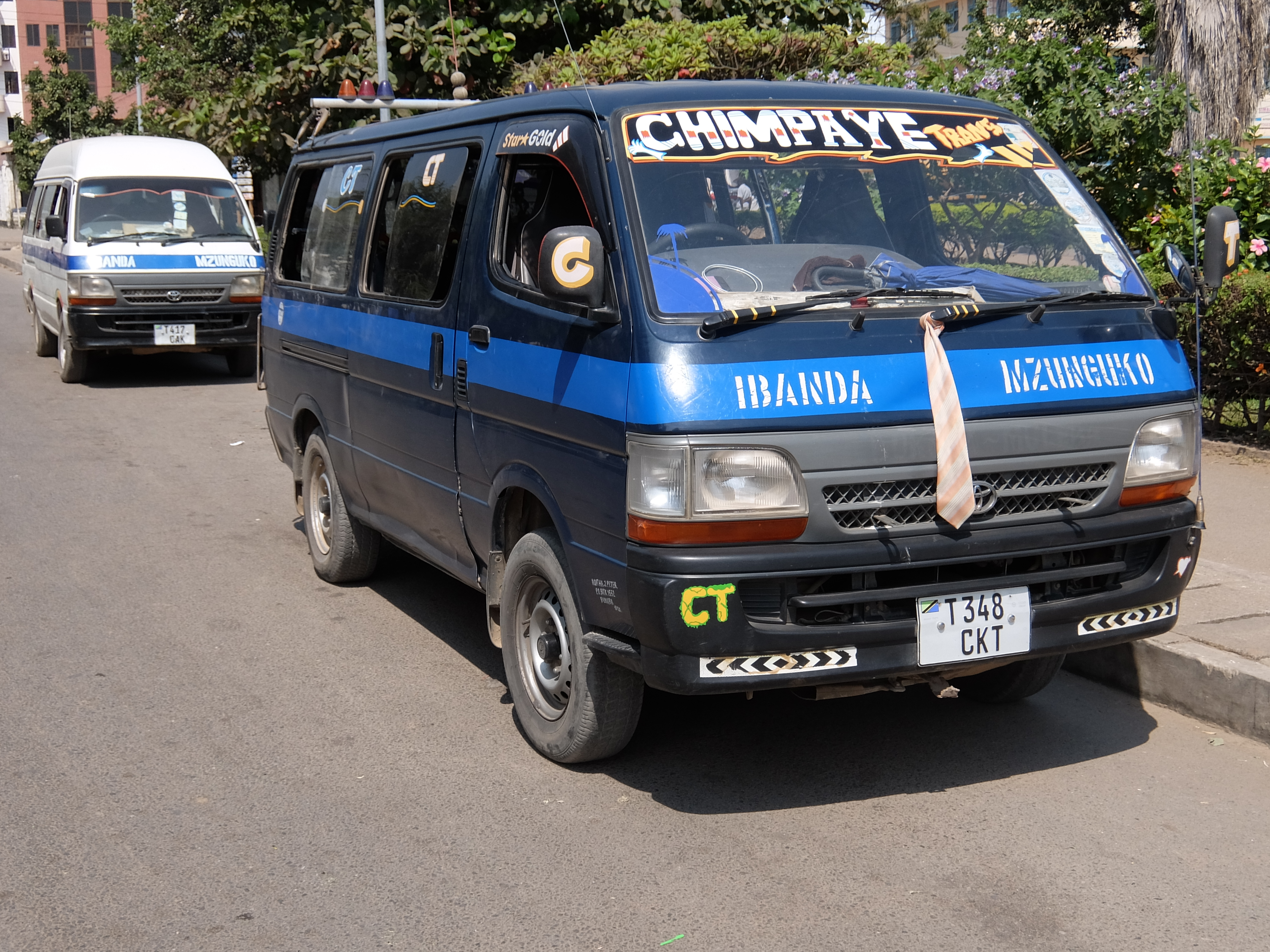
Two dala dala in the city of Mwanza in 2015

Dala dala are often operated by both a driver and a conductor. Called a mpigadebe, the name for dala dala conductors literally means "a person who hits a debe" (a 4-gallon tin container used for transporting gasoline or water) in reference to the fact that conductors will hit the roof and side of the van to attract customers and notify the driver when to leave a station.

== Regulation ==
These vehicles for hire have their routes allocated by a Tanzanian transport regulator, Land Transport Regulatory Authority of Tanzania (LATRA), (Note: Barrentt & Kumar, Page xii) but syndicates (informal groups that fix fares, collect dues, and manage stations) also exist. Before 1983, all forms of privately owned public transport were illegal in Tanzania, and as of 1991 and 1998 at least half of all dala dala continued to operate without a license.

In 2002 it was noted that the dala dala market "seems to remain under conditions close to classical perfect competition."

== See also ==
- Boda boda
- Matatu
- Tro tro
- Weyala, share taxi conductors in Ethiopia
