= Stadium diplomacy =

Financing of stadiums as a diplomatic tool

Stadium diplomacy is the construction of stadiums and sports facilities in other nations as a form of foreign aid with implementation also supporting the overseas expansion of donor-country construction contractors.

China is the most prominent practitioner of this strategy, using it as a form of soft power to bolster diplomatic ties. The practice dates back to at least 1958, when China funded the National Sports Stadium in Mongolia. The method contrasts from other methods such as stadium subsidy which uses taxpayers' money and gives it to the private sector to manage the facility and profit.

== Chinese diplomacy ==
The following includes overseas stadiums and sports facilities that were either donated outright or built with financial assistance from the Chinese government, typically in the form of grants, concessional loans, or other aid-linked financing in cooperation with the host country. Projects carried out solely by Chinese construction firms on commercial terms, without financing support from the Chinese government, are not included.

=== Africa ===
- Angola

Estádio 11 de Novembro in Luanda; Estádio Nacional do Chiazi in Cabinda; Ombaka National Stadium in Benguela; and Tundavala National Stadium in Lubango were all constructed by Chinese firms for the 2010 Africa Cup of Nations. One of the stadiums was provided at no direct cost, in exchange for Angola entering into two concessional loan agreements with China.

- Benin

Friendship Stadium was built with Chinese help in 1982

- Burkina Faso

Stade du 4 Août was built with a total cost of 4 billion CFA francs

- Cameroon

Yaoundé Multipurpose Sports Complex (2009) – A 5,000-seat indoor arena built in downtown Yaoundé as a gift from the Chinese government. Limbe Stadium (2012) and Kouekong Stadium (2016) in Bafoussam were both constructed by Chinese contractors with financing from concessional loans provided by the Export-Import Bank of China.

- Cape Verde

The 15,000 seater National Stadium (2013) construction by Top International Engineering began in 2010 and ended in 2013, at a cost of 1.4 billion Cape Verdean escudos, funded by the Chinese government.

- Central African Republic

Barthélemy Boganda Stadium was built from 2003 to 2006 at a cost of 12 billion CFA and seats 20,000 spectators.

- Chad

A new 30,000 seater national stadium, to be named after N'Garta Tombalbaye, is being built in N'Djamena with total cost of 50 billion CFA franc.

- Comoros

Construction began in May 2025 on a China-aided stadium and swimming center.

- Democratic Republic of Congo

Stade des Martyrs, opened in 1994 and was the second largest stadium at that time, was built by Chinese funds.

- Republic of Congo

China State Construction Engineering was one of the companies which built various sport venues in Brazzaville for Congolese preparation to host 2015 All-Africa Games which includes a 60,000 seater main stadium, a multi-sports arena, and an indoor pool.

- Djibouti

Djibouti City Stadium was built at the cost of 11 million USD between 1991 and 1993.

- Equatorial Guinea

Estadio de Bata was built by China Overseas Engineering Group in 2007. Estadio de Malabo was also built with support from Chinese government.

- Gabon

Stade d'Angondjé, also called the Sino-Gabonese Friendship Stadium, was a gift from Chinese government. Chinese government also helped in building Stade d'Oyem and Stade de Port-Gentil when Gabon was selected to host 2017 Africa Cup of Nations.

- Gambia

Independence Stadium was a gift by Chinese government and built in 1984.

- Ghana

Sekondi-Takoradi Stadium (2008) and Tamale Stadium (2008) were constructed with Chinese assistance, while Baba Yara Stadium and Accra Sports Stadium were renovated, all in preparation for the 2008 Africa Cup of Nations, supported by a soft loan of USD 31 million from the Chinese government. Cape Coast Sports Stadium (2016), a 15,000-seat multipurpose venue built by China Jiangxi Corporation at a reported cost of USD 30 million, was officially handed over to the Ministry of Youth and Sports as one of Ghana’s largest China-aided infrastructure projects at the time. In March 2025, following a temporary CAF suspension of Ghana’s stadiums for international matches, the government announced plans to renovate the Cape Coast facility and designate it as the exclusive home venue for the Black Stars.

- Guinea

Nongo Stadium is a 50,000 seater stadium finished in 2012 as a gift from Chinese government to the country. As Guinea was selected to host 2025 Africa Cup of Nations, an agreement was signed between two countries to further construct three more stadiums.

- Guinea-Bissau

Estádio 24 de Setembro is built by China National Corporation For Overseas Economic Cooperation. The stadium was later refurbished with Chinese help.

- Ivory Coast

Stade Olympique d'Ebimpé, a state-of-the-art stadium built for the 2023 Africa Cup of Nations, is considered one of Africa’s most technologically advanced football arenas. Designed with sweeping, spaceship-like curves and a roof that mimics an ocean wave, the stadium showcases elaborate architectural details including massive coliseum-style pillars and tricolour latticing reflecting the national flag. The project cost around £260 million ($330 million) and a large portion was funded by the Chinese government under its Belt and Road Initiative, with construction managed by the Beijing Construction Engineering Group.

- Kenya

Moi International Sports Centre, a facility which includes 60,000 seat stadium, 120-room hotel, and large swimming pool was built by the Chinese government as an assistance project in 1987 to enable Kenya host the All Africa Games. Another Chinese government grant of 12.8 million USD provided funds for the refurbishment of the complex from 2010-2012 by Shengli Engineering Construction.

- Liberia

Samuel Kanyon Doe Sports Complex was built in 1986 with Chinese funds. The stadium was later renovated with Chinese assistance.

- Malawi

Malawi National Stadium was opened in 2017 and costs USD 70 million which is funded by Chinese concessional loan.

- Mali

Stade du 26 Mars was built by a Chinese construction firm for 2002 Africa Cup of Nations

- Mauritania

Nouakchott Olympic Stadium was built in 1985 by Chinese government and later also renovated with Chinese funds in 2017.

- Mauritius

Stade Anjalay (1991) – The 15,000-seat multi-use stadium was financed by the Chinese government through a RMB 35 million interest-free loan, which also covered the construction of two bridges. The loan carried no interest and included a ten-year grace period followed by a ten-year repayment term. Côte d'Or National Sports Complex (2019) – The multi-sports complex at Saint Pierre was financed through a package of three RMB 50 million interest-free loans signed between 2012 and 2015, supplemented by a RMB 200 million Chinese government grant, for a total Chinese contribution of RMB 350 million. A formal exchange of notes was signed between the two governments on 8 November 2017. Construction was carried out by China State Construction Engineering and the complex was completed in time to host the 2019 Indian Ocean Island Games.

- Mozambique

Estádio do Zimpeto, the main venue for 2011 All-Africa Games, is built with US$ 70 million from Chinese government and can hold up to 42,000 spectators.

- Niger

Both the building of the Stade Général Seyni Kountché and its renovation almost two decades later were funded by Chinese support. Initial construction was handled by the China National Corporation for Overseas Economic Cooperation and renovation construction was handled by the China Geo-Engineering Corporation.

- Rwanda

Stade Amahoro (1988) - Construction of this aid project by the China Civil Engineering Construction Corporation started in 1984 and finished in 1988. During the Rwandan genocide the stadium was the safety point which Tutsis tried to escape to as it was secured by UN peacekeepers.

- Senegal

Leopold Senghor Stadium (1985) is a 60,000 seat stadium financed by the Chinese government.

- Seychelles

Swimming pool (1992) - The Chinese government assisted in the construction of a swimming pool in 1992 and would later also help out in the renovation of the pool in 2011, in time for the training of Seychellois athletes for the forthcoming Indian Ocean Islands Games.

- Sierra Leone

National Stadium and Bo Stadium (2014)

- Somalia

Mogadishu Stadium (1978) - The stadium seating a capacity of 35,000 was constructed by a Chinese construction firm. The structure has withstood the long conflict in Somalia, and serves as the staging base for the peacekeeping operations of AMISOM and earlier to that was a base for United Nations Operation in Somalia II, forming part of the backdrop of the events of Black Hawk Down.

- South Sudan

A new 15,000 seater stadium in Juba built with Chinese funding has been approved by South Sudanese government.

- Tanzania

Uhuru Stadium enlargement (1969); Amaan Stadium (1970); Tanzania National Main Stadium (2007) - Construction work to enlarge the Dar es Salaam stadium was completed in June 1969 based on Chinese aid. The Amaan Stadium was constructed with Chinese aid in 1970 and underwent refurbishment again with Chinese assistance, reopening in 2010.

- Togo

Stade de Kégué is built in 2000 by funds from Chinese government.

- Uganda

Mandela National Stadium (1997) - The 40,000 seat stadium opened in 1997 as a donation by the Chinese government. Another grant by the Chinese government of 3 million in 2011 funded a facelift for the stadium.

- Zambia

Chinese firms are involved in building Levy Mwanawasa Stadium and National Heroes Stadium together with the refurbishment of Independence Stadium.

- Zimbabwe

Chinese government funded both the building of National Sports Stadium in 1987 and its refurbishment in 2006.

=== Americas ===
- Antigua and Barbuda

Sir Vivian Richards Stadium (2007) - Funded by a Chinese government grant, the 60 million USD cricket stadium is a 20,000 seat complex built in time for the 2007 Cricket World Cup.

- Bahamas

National Stadium of The Bahamas at Queen Elizabeth Sports Centre (2012) - The 35 million USD stadium was chosen by the government of the Bahamas from among several choices for a substantial gift from China.

- Barbados

Garfield Sobers Gymnasium (1992) – A 6,000-seat indoor sports facility with a swimming pool and amenities for twelve sports, constructed between 1990 and 1992 by China State Construction Engineering under a grant of 16 million Barbados dollars from the Chinese government.
National Stadium (under construction, 2025–2028) – A new national stadium being built at Waterford, St. Michael, at a total cost of 80 million Barbados dollars through a grant from the People’s Republic of China. The project, undertaken by Beijing Construction Engineering Group, follows the demolition of the old 1970 stadium and will feature a 10,000-seat Phase I with plans to expand to 20,000 seats in Phase II.

- Costa Rica

National Stadium, built following a breakaway from diplomatic recognition of Taiwan in favor of China by the Costa Rican government in 2007, China spent an estimated 100 million USD to construct the stadium from 2008 to 2011. Local newspaper, the Tico Times called the stadium "Costa Rica’s jewel" and the design "an aerodynamic masterpiece".

- Dominica

Windsor Park (2007) - In exchange for severing diplomatic ties with Taiwan in 2004, the government of China donated the 12,000 seat stadium, constructed and designed at a cost of 45 million East Caribbean dollars by China Civil Engineering Construction Corporation and Wuhan Architectural and Design Institute along with several Dominican engineers sent to China to join the design team. A local paper covering the opening night described "scenes of raw excitement and drama not seen in Dominica since November 3, 1978 when the island attained political independence from Great Britain...Roseau erupted in a wild frenzy for a moment in time that probably won’t be repeated again in the lifetimes of the thousands gathered to witness it."

- El Salvador

National Stadium, is currently under construction in Antiguo Cuscatlán after El Salvador cut ties with Taiwan in 2018 and reestablished ties with China. The stadium's capacity will be 50,000. The announcement was made on 30 December 2021 by Nayib Bukele on Twitter. China will spend an estimated 500 million USD to construct the stadium from 2022 to 2025.

- Grenada

Queen's Park Stadium (2007) – The hurricane-damaged stadium was rebuilt as a $40 million gift from China in time for the 2007 Cricket World Cup. The gift followed Grenada’s 2005 diplomatic switch from Taiwan to the People's Republic of China. Subsequently, the Export-Import Bank of Taiwan sued the government of Grenada for defaulting on multiple development loans, which had originally helped fund the construction of Queen's Park Stadium and other projects.

- Jamaica

Sligoville Mini-Stadium (2007), including a 600-seat basketball and netball court; 1,200-seat cricket oval; a 1,500-seat football field; and a 400-metre track circling the football field. The gift from the government of China was constructed by the Shanxi Construction Engineering Group Corporation. Despite the investment, the facility quickly became underutilised and fell into disrepair, with rotting fencing, broken floodlights, decaying wooden seats, and overgrown grass. Residents and local representatives have highlighted the missed potential for income generation and youth sports development, noting that the absence of dormitory facilities has limited use by sporting associations and universities. In 2008 the then member of parliament and former Foreign Affairs Minister KD Knight emphasized that no taxpayer money would be used for the stadium's maintenance, stating, "We will not allow it to be in need of any money from the budget and we don’t want any budget money to run it, maintain it, and use it to the fullest capacity."

- Suriname

Anthony Nesty Sporthal (1987) - An indoor sports hall built by the Chinese government and paid for through a loan extended from China. The facility is actively used to host sports events, concerts, fairs, and occasional political assemblies for electing the President of Suriname.

=== Asia ===
- Cambodia

In 2014, Prime Minister Hun Sen requested that China help construct a stadium for Cambodia in advance of the 2023 Southeast Asian Games. China began building Morodok Techo National Stadium in 2017 at a cost of US$169 million and completed it for Cambodia in December 2021.

- Laos

New Laos National Stadium (2009) - A sports complex with a 25,000 seat main venue and a 2,000 capacity indoor aquatics complex, with an outdoor warm-up pool, a tennis centre with 2,000 seats, six other tennis courts, two indoor stadiums each with a seating for 3,000 and an indoor shooting range with 50 seats. It was built in time for the 2009 Southeast Asian Games. In August 2008 the government stated 200 hectares of land in the outskirts of Vientiane was exchanged as part of the financing agreement with the Chinese government.

- Mongolia

National Sports Stadium (1958) and Buyant Ukhaa Sport Palace (2011) – The National Sports Stadium in Ulaanbaatar was constructed in 1958 with Chinese aid and was among the first major sports infrastructure projects funded by China during the Cold War. It marked the start of extensive Chinese development assistance to Mongolia and remains the country’s most important sporting venue, hosting the annual Naadam festival. Decades later, the National Wrestling Palace was completed in 2011 with a ¥28 million grant from the Chinese government, providing a modern indoor arena to support traditional Mongolian wrestling and enhance training and competition facilities.

- Myanmar

Thuwunna Stadium and National Theatre of Yangon were built by the Chinese government as gifts in the 1980s, those buildings were also renovated with Chinese help.

- Nepal

Dashrath Stadium has undergone multiple renovation phases since the 1990s. Chinese government grants contributed to refurbishment work, including infrastructure improvements reported in 1999 and 2012. The 2012 upgrades included enhancements to lighting systems, installation of a backup generator, and improvements to the scoreboard and sound systems.

- Syria

A stadium located in Damascus built in 1980 by China National Corporation for Overseas Economic Cooperation using Chinese government aid funds.

=== Europe ===
- Belarus

Belarusian National Football Stadium (2025) – A 33,000-seat national stadium in Minsk built with Chinese government support and constructed under a general contract by Beijing Urban Construction Group. Opened in June 2025, it is the largest and most modern football venue in Belarus and was gifted as part of China’s foreign aid program.

=== South Pacific ===
- Cook Islands

Telecom Sports Arena (2009) - A 1000-seat sports complex housing netball, volleyball, handball, weightlifting, and squash. Funding for the $14 million facility came from concessional loans provided by the Chinese government.

- Federated States of Micronesia

FSM-China Friendship Sports Center (2002) - A multipurpose gym built from 1999-2002 by the Guangzhou International Economic And Technical Cooperation Company at a cost of 5 million USD was turned over to FSM from the government of China.

- Fiji

National Hockey Centre - Built with financial assistance from the Chinese government for the 2003 South Pacific Games.

- Kiribati

Betia Sports Complex (2006) - Construction of the sports complex began in 2002 with a 5.5 million USD grant from the government of China. When Kiribati severed diplomatic ties with China by switching to Taiwan, China suspended work on the partially completed project. Taiwan restarted construction and the complex opened in 2006. The facilities include indoor and outdoor basketball courts, a soccer and football ground and a gymnasium seating more than one thousand.

- Papua New Guinea

Wewak Sports Stadium (2010) - A stadium was built at a cost of 19 million Kina, the combined contribution of 12 million Kina in funds from the Chinese government and 7 million Kina contributed by Papua New Guinea.

- Samoa

Apia Park Stadium (1983) - A stadium built as an aid project by China for Samoa to host the 7th South-Pacific Games. When it came time in 2007, for Samoa to once again host the games, the Chinese government provided a grant of 19 million USD to refurbish the facilities, using a team of Chinese engineers with local contractors to do the work.

- Solomon Islands

National Stadium (2023) - A stadium was built at a cost of 71 million US dollars, as part of an aid project by China for Solomon Islands to host the 17th Pacific Games.

=== Taiwan counter-stadium diplomacy ===
To compte with Chinese's influence and to safeguard its international recognition, Taiwan also engaged in stadium diplomacy. Unable to match the multi-million-dollar, mega-infrastructure volume of China's checkbook, Taiwan provides specialized, modest, or complementary financial assistance.

==== Cricket and football in the Caribbean ====
During the 2000s, the competition between the People's Republic of China and Taiwan played out in the Caribbean through stadium diplomacy. Beijing funded large-scale cricket and multi-purpose stadiums in countries that switched diplomatic recognition to China, while Taiwan provided more modest support to its remaining Caribbean allies.

- Haiti

In Haiti, Taiwan completed a renovation of the Sylvio Cator stadium, Port-au-Prince.

- Saint Kitts and Nevis

In Saint Kitts and Nevis, Taiwan supported Warner Park Stadium with a US$21 million donation ahead of the 2007 Cricket World Cup.

- Saint Lucia

In Saint Lucia, the George Odlum Stadium was originally built by China in 2002, and Taiwan later contributed to refurbishment by upgrading the athletics track after the country switched diplomatic recognition back to Taiwan in 2007.

- Saint Vincent and the Grenadines

In Saint Vincent and the Grenadines, Taiwan financed warm-up facilities.

==== Various sport infrastructures in the Pacific ====
- Marshall Islands

Taiwan funded the construction of the track and field facility in Jenrok. In 2026, Taiwan officially waived the $6.2 million construction loan and converted it into a grant. Through community development programs and the Development Bank of the Marshall Islands, Taiwan has financed smaller local amenities like playgrounds and lighting for basketball courts.

- Palau

Taiwan has supported the construction of a new gymnasium and a refurbishment of the national stadium in Koror, the capital of Palau to host the 2025 Pacific Mini Games.

== Diplomacy by other countries ==
- Guyana

Providence Stadium (2006) – A 15,000-seat cricket venue built with Indian financing, including a US$6 million grant and US$20 million in low-interest loans from the Government of India.

- Haiti

Phoenix Stadium (2010) - Funded by the United States to replace a soccer stadium destroyed by the Haiti earthquake and later year (2026) but re-construction of stadium.

- Liberia

Samuel Kanyon Doe (SKD) Sports Complex (2026) - Study on feasibility of renovation funded by Saudi Arabia.

== Economic impact ==
On going research or studies are being undertaken to quantify economic impact of these stadiums on various jurisdictions and the local economy. In 2025 the Saudi Fund for Development issued a press conference along with FIFA to announce its joint agenda for supporting stadium development and infrastructure for willing developing nations.

== See also ==
- Panda diplomacy
- Public–private partnership unit
- Sportswashing
- List of future stadiums
