= Dodoma Stadium =

Stadium in Dodoma, Tanzania

- Location within Tanzania
- Location: Dodoma, Tanzania
- Coordinates: 06°10′52″S 35°44′49″E
- Capacity: 32,000 (expected)
- Surface: Grass
- Field size: 105m × 68m

Construction
- Groundbreaking: February 2025
- Built: 2025–2027 (expected)
- Opened: February 2027 (expected)
- Cost: US$135 million (estimate)
- General contractor: SPAR

Tenant
- 2027 Africa Cup of Nations

Dodoma Stadium is a sports stadium under construction, in the city of Dodoma, Tanzania. It is intended to be used during the 2027 Africa Cup of Nations soccer tournament. The stadium is one of the stadia that Tanzania plans to use during the tournament, that will be jointly hosted by Tanzania, Uganda and Kenya.

The stadium name may be changed in the near future.

== Location ==
The stadium is located in the neighborhood known as "Nzuguni area".

== Overview ==
Dodoma Stadium, with planned capacity of 32,000 is intended for soccer matches and other sporting events such as athletics. The primary purpose of this stadium is to be part of the host stadia that Tanzania will use for the 2027 Africa Cup of Nations in a tri-state-host tournament to be held in the East African countries of Kenya, Tanzania and Uganda. The other Tanzanian stadia are the 60,000 seater Benjamin Mkapa Stadium in Dar es Salaam and the 30,000 seater Samia Suluhu Hassan Stadium in Arusha.

In September 2023, the Confederation of African Football (CAF), announced the East Africa Pamoja bid by Kenya, Uganda and Tanzania as the winning bid to host the 2027 AFCON tournament. The bid beat out other bids by other countries including Egypt, Senegal, Botswana and Algeria. At the bidding stage the Tanzania Football Federation nominated the three Nairobi national stadiums and the 10,000 seater Kipchoge Keino Stadium in Eldoret.

== Construction ==
The construction contract was awarded to Italian construction company SPAR.
