= Arusha Sports Stadium =

Proposed sports stadium in Tanzania

- Location within Tanzania
- Location: Olomoti, Arusha, Arusha Region, Tanzania
- Coordinates: 03°22′58″S 36°36′55″E
- Capacity: 30,000 (Expected)
- Surface: Grass

Construction
- Groundbreaking: 6 April 2024
- Built: 2024 - 2026 (Expected)
- Opened: 2026 (Expected)
- Cost: TZS:286 billion (US$111 million)
- Main contractor: China Railway Construction Engineering Group Limited (CRCEG)

The Arusha Sports Stadium, is a planned multi-purpose stadium in Tanzania. It is intended to be used for the first time, during the 2027 Africa Cup of Nations soccer tournament. The stadium is one of the stadia that Tanzania plans to use during the tournament, that will be jointly hosted by Uganda, Kenya and Tanzania.

== Location ==
The stadium would be located in the city of Arusha, in Arusha Region, in northeastern Tanzania. The proposed stadium will sit on a total of 36.1 acres (14.6 ha) of real estate, in "Olmoti Ward", on land owned by the Tanzanian Ministry of Culture Arts and Sports.

== Overview ==
Arusha Sports Stadium is mainly intended for soccer matches, although other sports such as athletics are also expected to be practiced here. The stadium has a proposed capacity of 30,000. The primary purpose of this stadium is to be part of the host stadia that Tanzania will use to host the 2027 Africa Cup of Nations in a tri-state-host tournament to be held in the East African countries of Kenya, Tanzania and Uganda. The other Tanzanian stadium is the 60,000 seater Benjamin Mkapa National Stadium, in Dar es Salaam.

In September 2023, the Confederation of African Football (CAF), announced the East Africa Pamoja bid by Kenya, Uganda and Tanzania as the winning bid to host the 2027 AFCON tournament. The bid beat out other bids by other countries including Egypt, Senegal, Botswana and Algeria.

At the bidding stage the Tanzania Football Federation (TFF) nominated Benjamin Mkapa National Stadium in Dar es Salaam and two new stadia, one in the capital city of Dodoma and the other in Arusha. In April 2024, The Citizen reported that the third stadium will not be the proposed new Dodoma Stadium, but instead the 15,000 seater Amaan Stadium in Zanzibar.

== Construction ==
The engineering, procurement and construction (EPC) contract was awarded to China Railway Construction Engineering Group Limited (CRCEG), a Chinese state-owned company at a contract price of TZS:286 billion (approx. US$111 million). Construction is expected to start in April 2024 and last approximately two years.

On 6 April 2024, the construction site was officially handed over to the contractor by Damas Ndumbaro, the Tanzanian Minister for Culture, Arts and Sports. Construction is expected to start immediately and last 22 months.

== Official name ==
Some stakeholders have proposed to name this stadium as Samia Suluhu Hassan Stadium, in honor of Samia Suluhu Hassan, the current President of Tanzania. That decision awaits the opinion of the head of state.

== See also ==
- List of African stadiums by capacity
- List of stadiums in Africa
- List of stadiums in Tanzania
- Sheikh Amri Abeid Memorial Stadium
