= Samia Suluhu Hassan Stadium =

Sports stadium in Tanzania

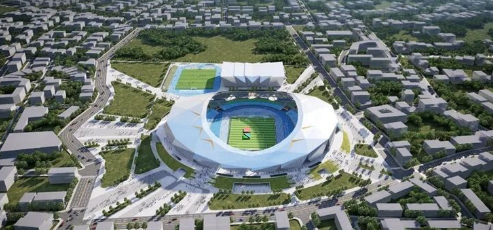

- Location within Tanzania
- Location: Arusha, Tanzania
- Coordinates: 03°24′30″S 36°36′44″E
- Capacity: 30,000 (expected)
- Surface: Grass
- Field size: 105m × 68m

Construction
- Groundbreaking: 8 April 2024
- Built: 2024–2026 (expected)
- Opened: Not yet Officially opened
- Cost: US$112 million (estimate)
- General contractor: China Railway Construction Engineering Group

Tenant
- 2027 Africa Cup of Nations

Samia Suluhu Hassan Stadium is a sports stadium under construction, in the city of Arusha, Tanzania. It is intended to be used during the 2027 Africa Cup of Nations soccer tournament. The stadium is one of the stadia that Tanzania plans to use during the tournament, that will be jointly hosted by Tanzania, Uganda and Kenya.

The stadium is named after Samia Suluhu Hassan, the incumbent president of Tanzania.

== Location ==
The stadium is located in the neighborhood known as "Olomoti area".

== Overview ==
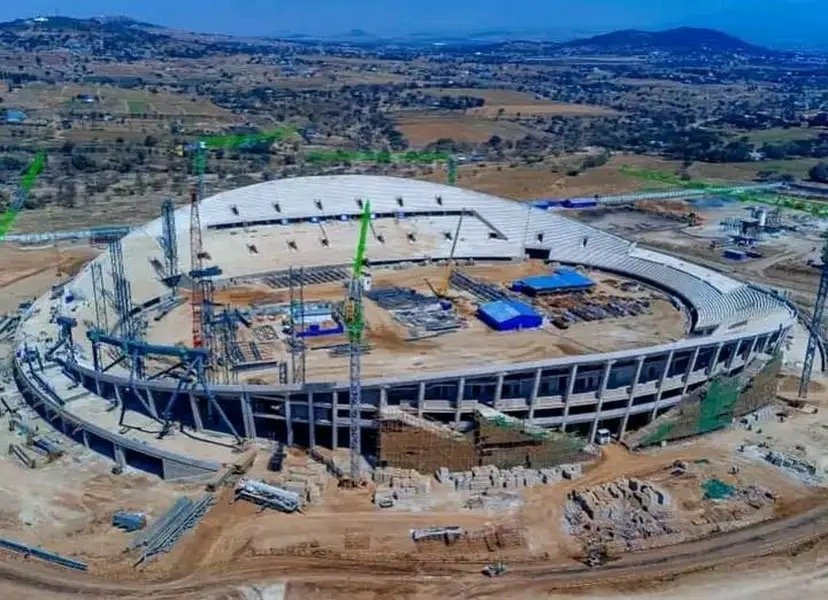
Stadium during construction September 2025

Samia Suluhu Hassan Stadium, with planned capacity of 30,000 is intended for soccer matches and rugby matches and events such as athletics. The primary purpose of this stadium is to be part of the host stadia that Tanzania will use to host the 2027 Africa Cup of Nations in a tri-state-host tournament to be held in the East African countries of Kenya, Tanzania and Uganda. The other Tanzanian stadia are the 60,000 seater Benjamin Mkapa Stadium in Dar es Salaam and the proposed 32,000 seater Dodoma Stadium in Dodoma.

In September 2023, the Confederation of African Football (CAF), announced the East Africa Pamoja bid by Kenya, Uganda and Tanzania as the winning bid to host the 2027 AFCON tournament. The bid beat out other bids by other countries including Egypt, Senegal, Botswana and Algeria. At the bidding stage the Tanzania Football Federation nominated the three Nairobi national stadiums and the 10,000 seater Kipchoge Keino Stadium in Eldoret.

== Construction ==
The construction contract was awarded to China Railway Construction Engineering Group (CRCEG), a subsidiary of China Railway Group Limited (CREC), a Chinese, majority state-owned, publicly traded, multinational engineering and construction conglomerate.
