= Workers' Stadium =

Football stadium in Beijing

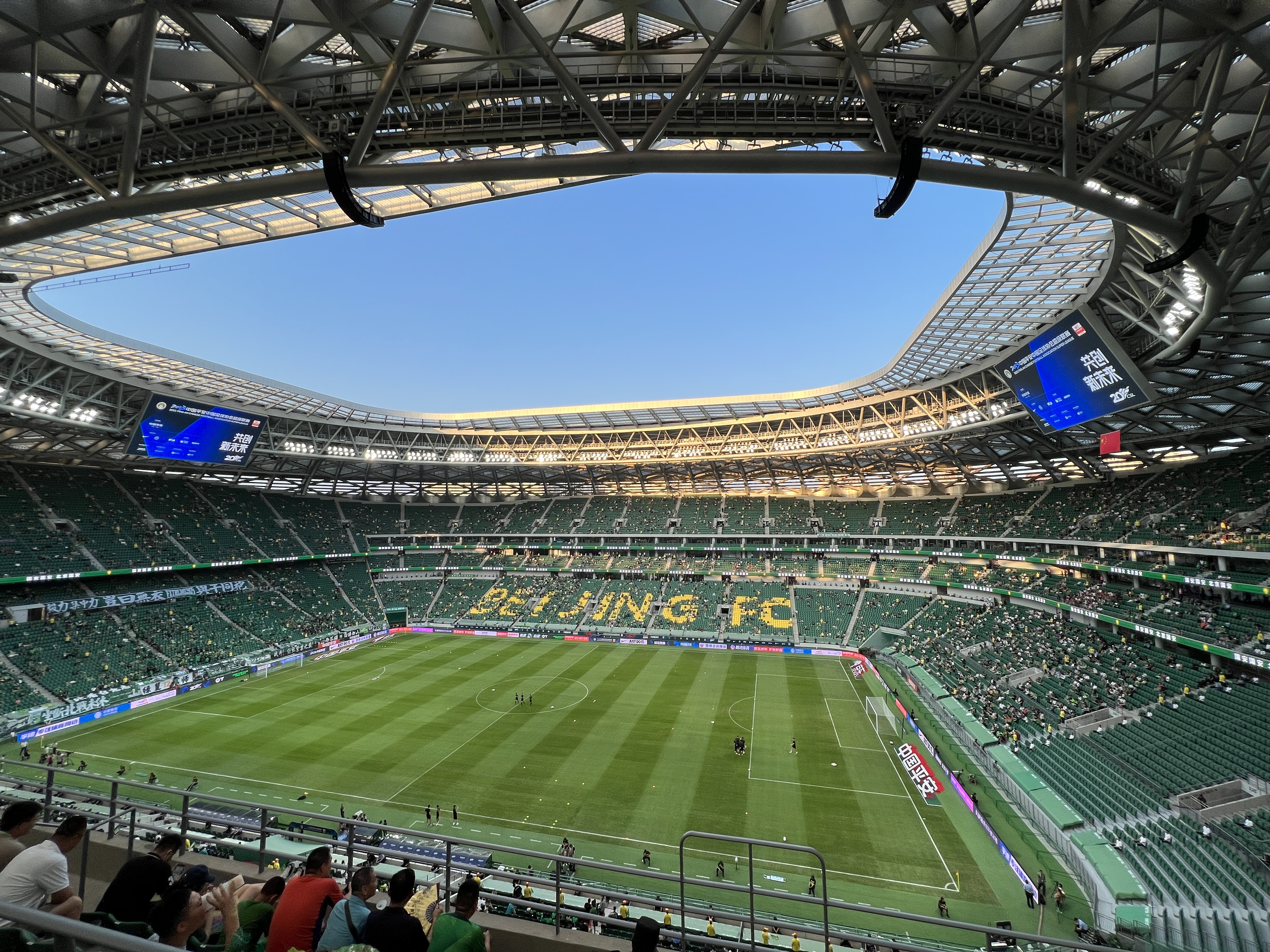
- Interactive map of Workers' Stadium
- Location: Chaoyang, Beijing, China
- Coordinates: 39°55′46.3″N 116°26′28.1″E
- Owner: All-China Federation of Trade Unions
- Operator: Sinobo Group
- Capacity: 68,000
- Surface: Grass
- Record attendance: 64,118 (Beijing Guoan vs Shanghai Shenhua, 21 March 2026)
- Public transit: 3 17 at Workers' Stadium

Construction
- Opened: 15 April 2023
- Architect: Beijing Institute of Architectural Design
- Structural engineer: Beijing Construction Engineering Group

Tenant
- Beijing Guoan (2023–present)

Website
- gongti.com.cn

Workers' Stadium
- Simplified Chinese: 工人体育场
- Traditional Chinese: 工人體育場
Transcriptions
Standard Mandarin
- Hanyu Pinyin: Gōngrén Tǐyùchǎng
- Wade–Giles: Kūngrén T'ǐyǜch'ǎng
- Yale Romanization: Gūngrén Tǐyùchǎng
- IPA: [kʊ́ŋɻə̌n tʰìŷʈʂʰàŋ]

The Workers' Stadium (Chinese: 工人体育场; pinyin: Gōngrén Tǐyùchǎng) is a football stadium in Chaoyang, Beijing, China. It opened in 2023 on the site of the original Workers' Stadium, which was demolished in 2020. One of the largest football stadiums in China, the stadium is the home of Beijing Guoan, a club that plays in the Chinese Super League.

== History ==
On 4 January 2020, Workers' Stadium was announced as a host venue for the 2023 AFC Asian Cup.

After finishing the 2019 season, Beijing Guoan moved to Beijing Fengtai Stadium as construction ahead of the tournament from Beijing Construction Engineering Group took place.

However, on 14 May 2022, AFC announced that China would not be able to host the tournament due to the exceptional circumstances caused by the COVID-19 pandemic.

On 31 December 2022, the new Workers' Stadium hosted its first event, as the New Year's Eve party called "Embrace a New Journey – 2023 BRTV New Year's Eve" took place in the stadium and was broadcast on Beijing Satellite TV.

The renovated Workers' Stadium opened officially on 15 April 2023, which included the opening ceremony of the 2023 Chinese Super League, prior to the opening match of its season between Beijing Guoan and Meizhou Hakka. Meizhou Hakka midfielder Ye Chugui scored the first ever goal in the stadium.

On 15 June 2023, the stadium hosted its first international friendly match when Argentina beat Australia 2–0, with Lionel Messi scoring his fastest ever international career goal in just 79 seconds.

== Location ==
The stadium is located in Beijing's Chaoyang district. It occupies the block bounded by Gongrentiyuchang North, East, South, and West Road. It is across the street from the Workers' Indoor Arena and is near the Sanlitun business area.

=== Transportation ===
The stadium is accessible by the Beijing subway, with Workers' Stadium station serving the location on Line 17 and Line 3. The Line 17 platform opened on 30 December 2023, and the Line 3 platform opened on 15 December 2024. The subway lines help tie the stadium to the eastern and northern neighborhoods of Beijing.

== Average attendances ==
Tenants	League season	Home games	Average attendance
Beijing Guoan	2024	15	46,444
Beijing Guoan	2023	15	43,769

== Photo gallery ==
Photos of the Workers' Stadium
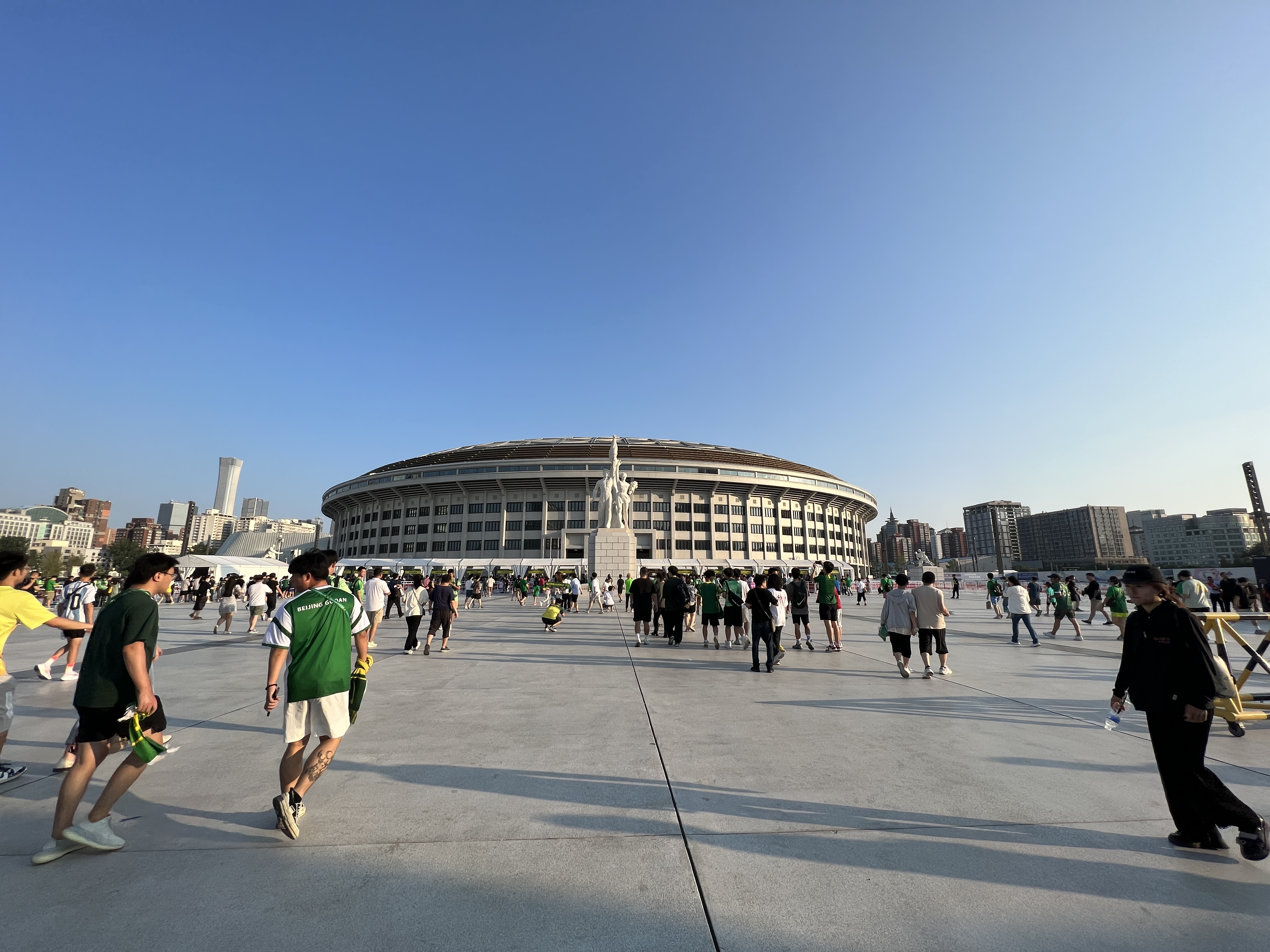
View of the stadium from the northern gate

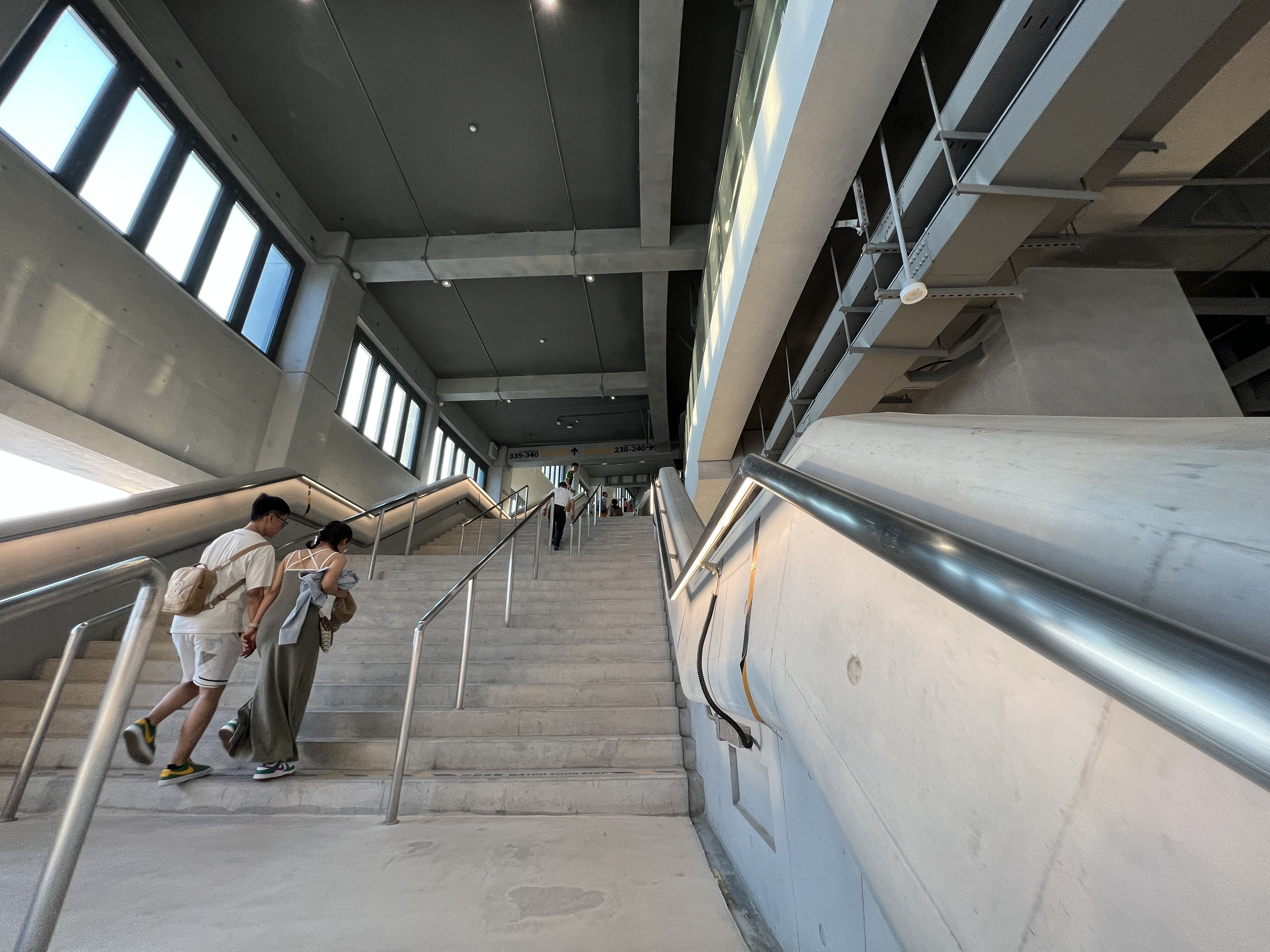
Stairs leading to upper stands

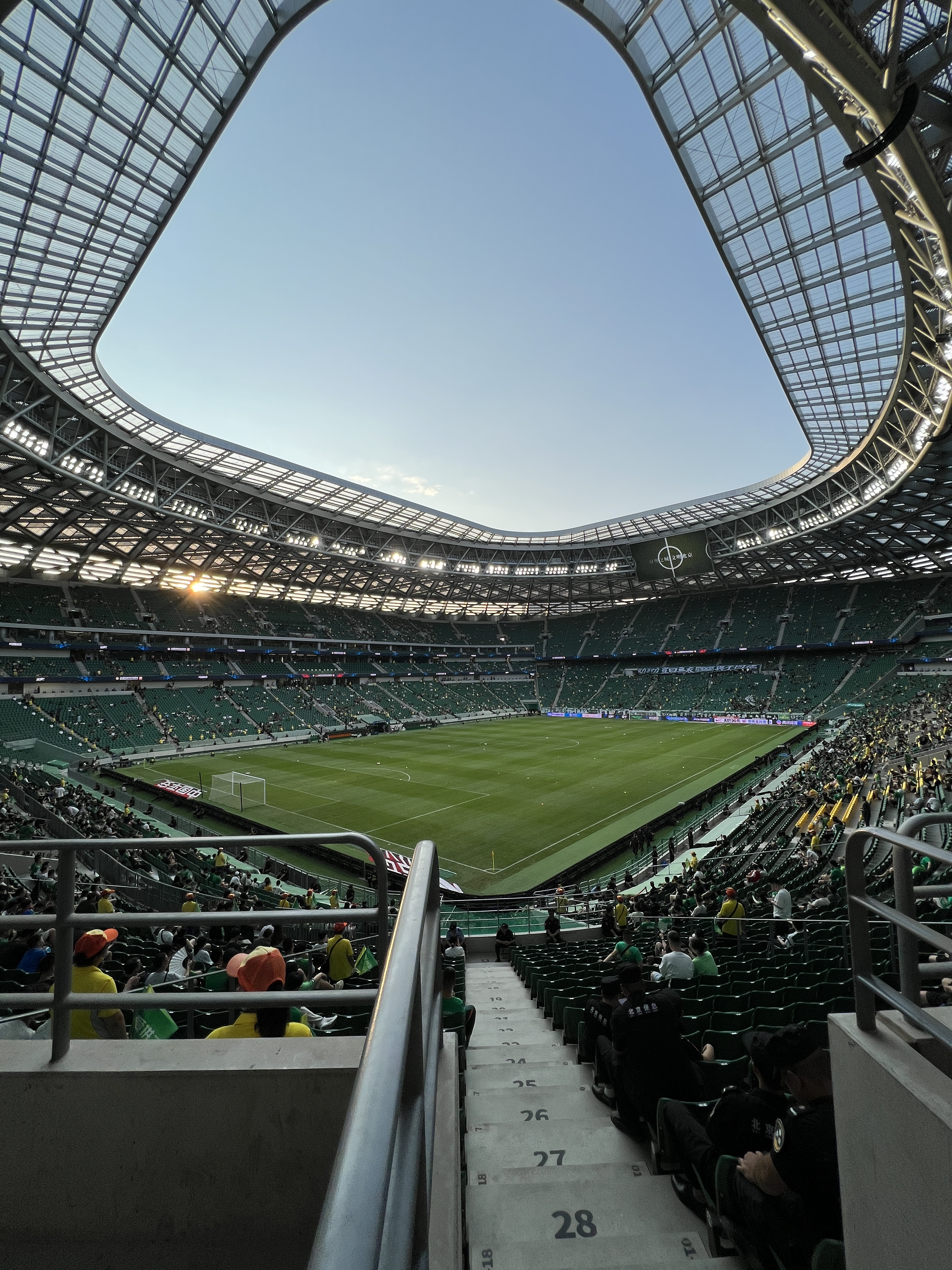
View of the pitch from the stadium's southeastern corner

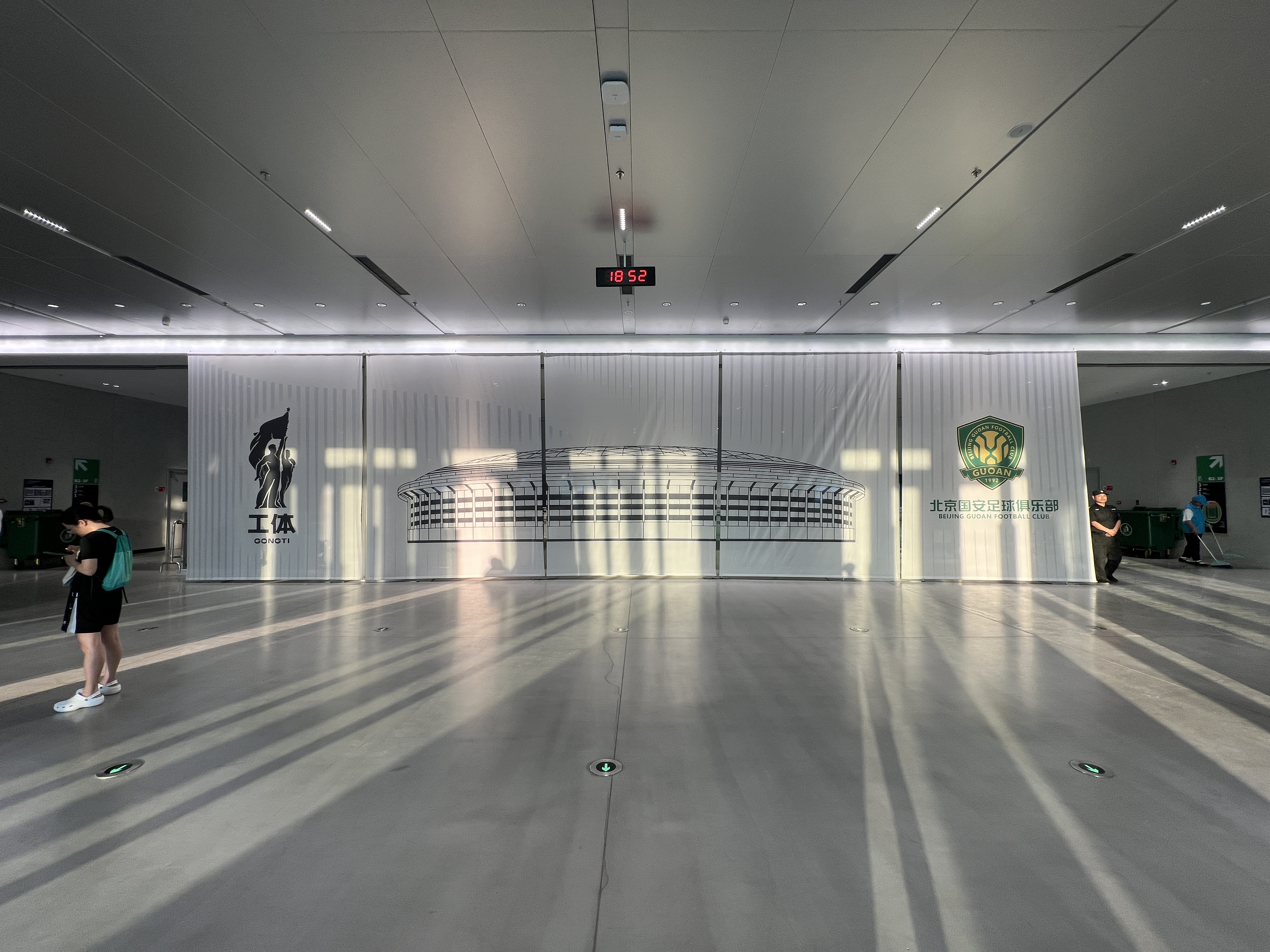
Beijing Guoan banner in front of the VIP stand

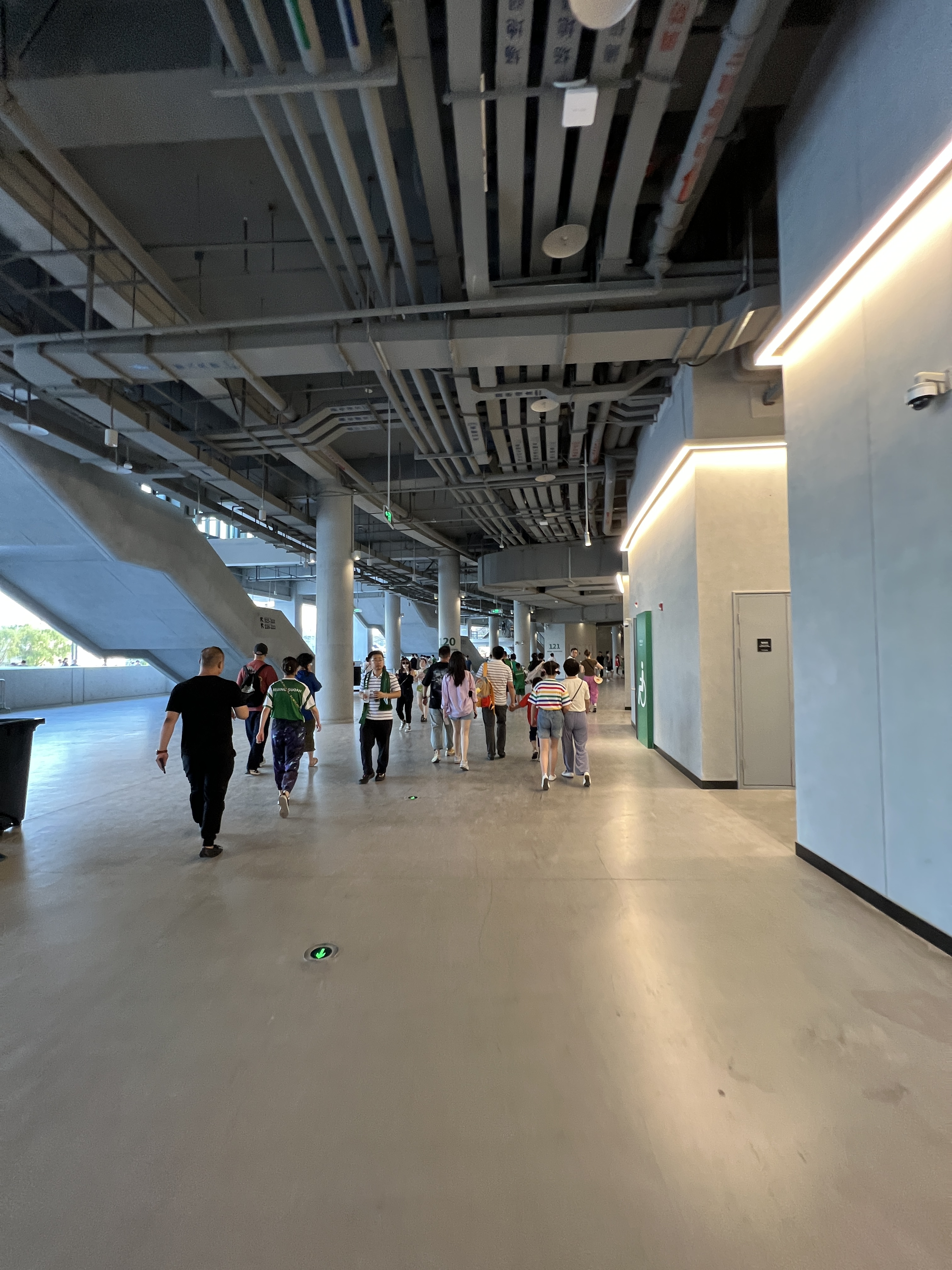
Ground floor walkways

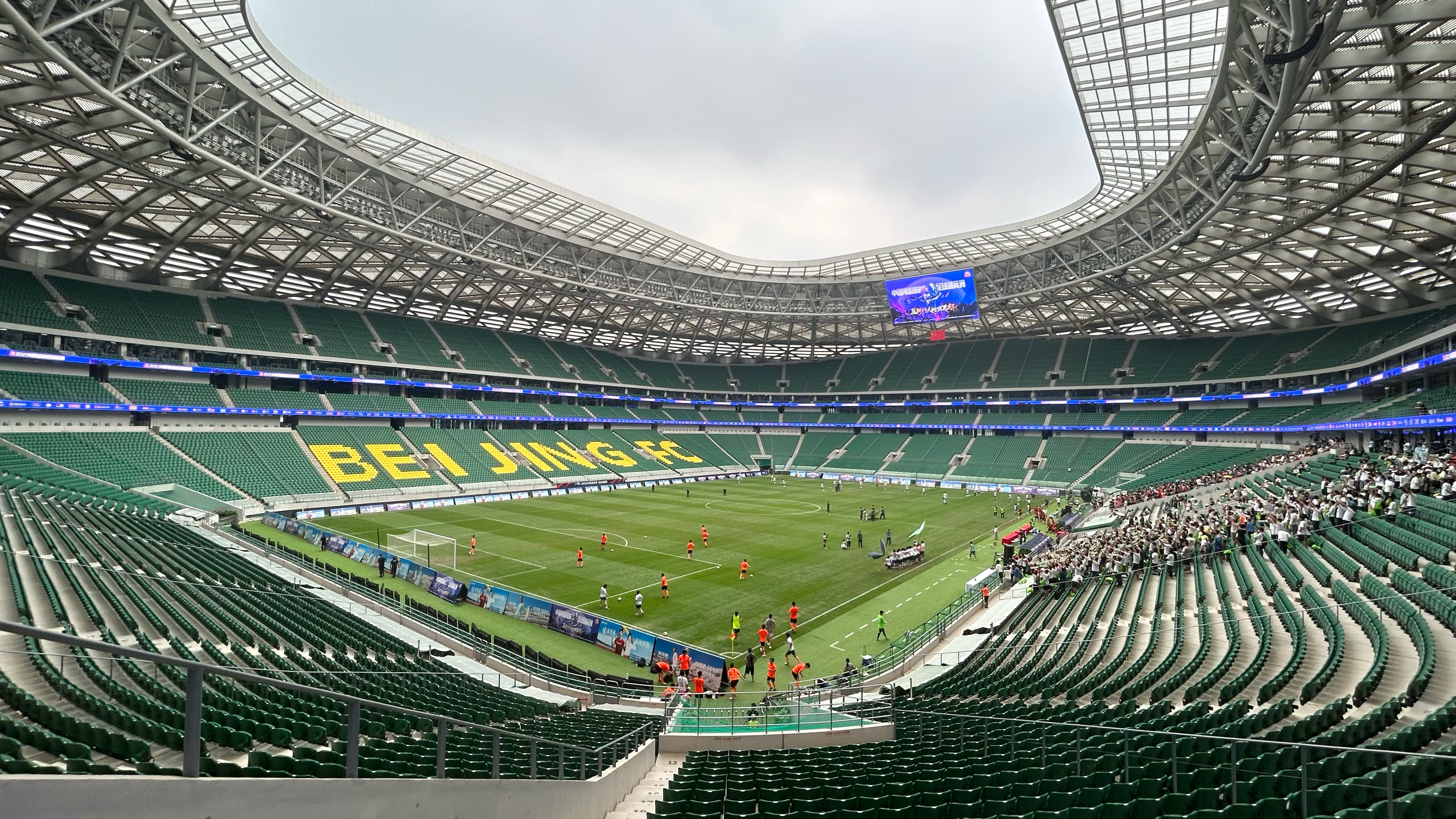
View of the pitch

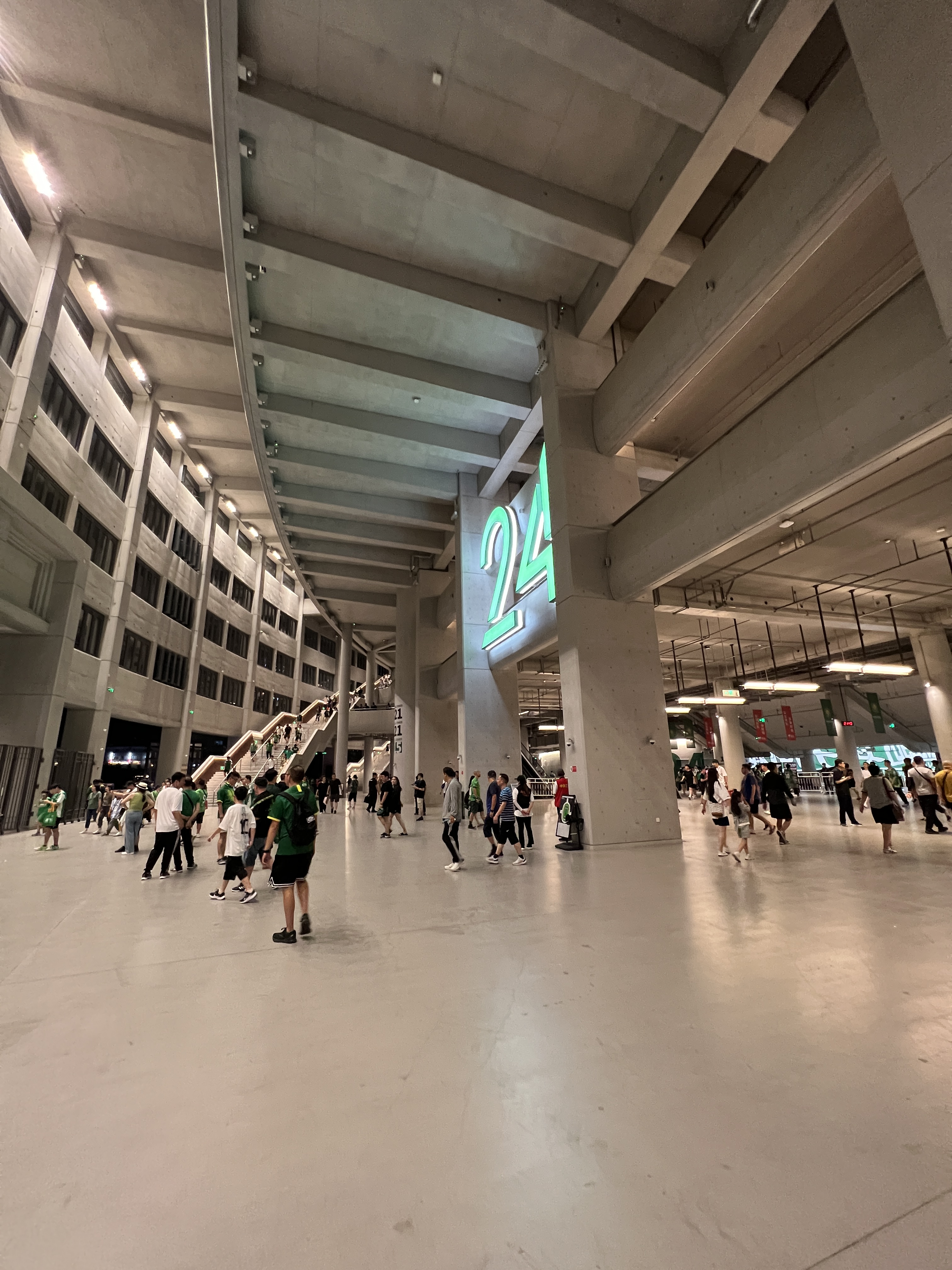
Stand 24 at the end of a match

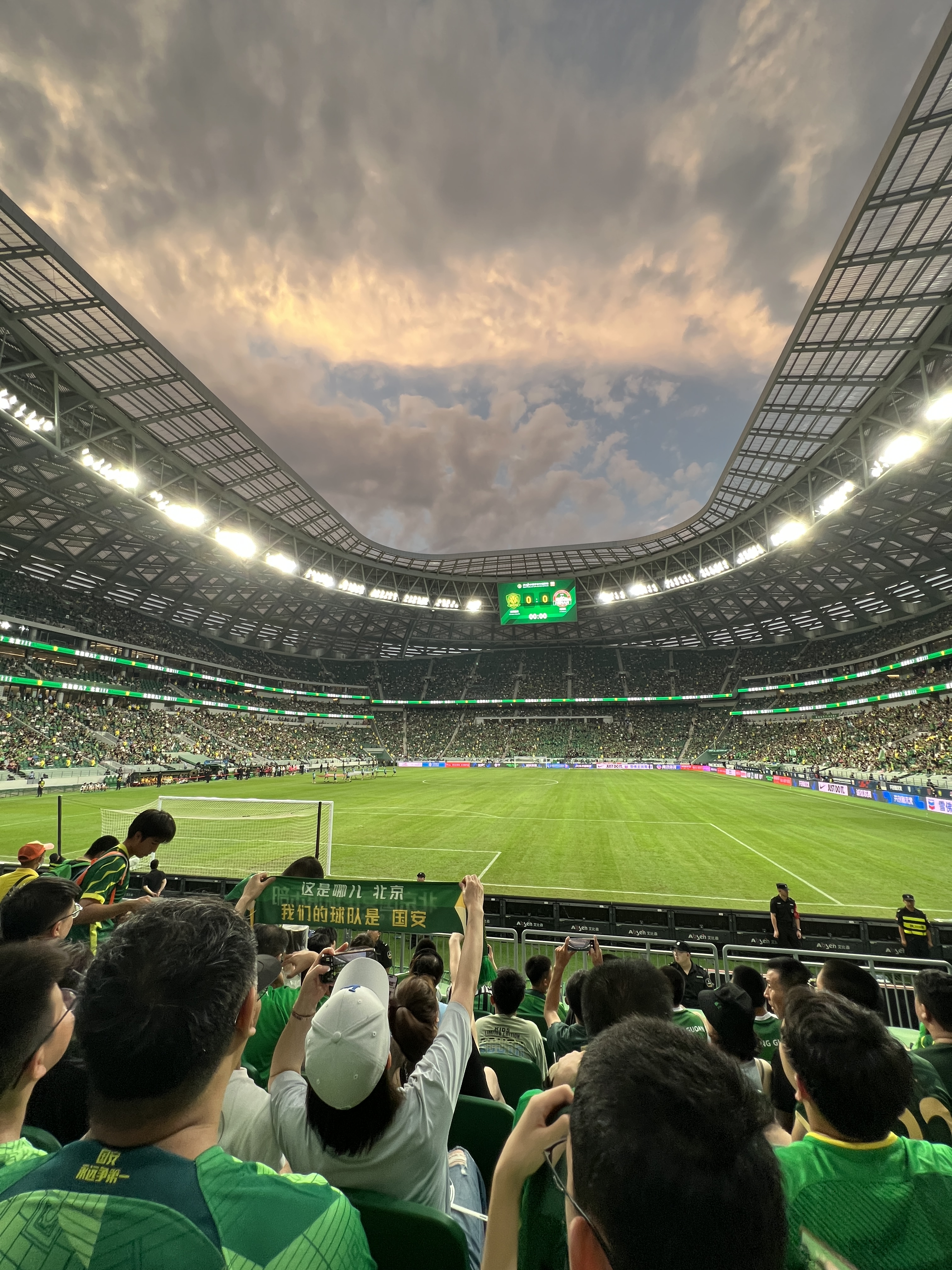
View from the southern stands ahead of a Beijing Guoan match

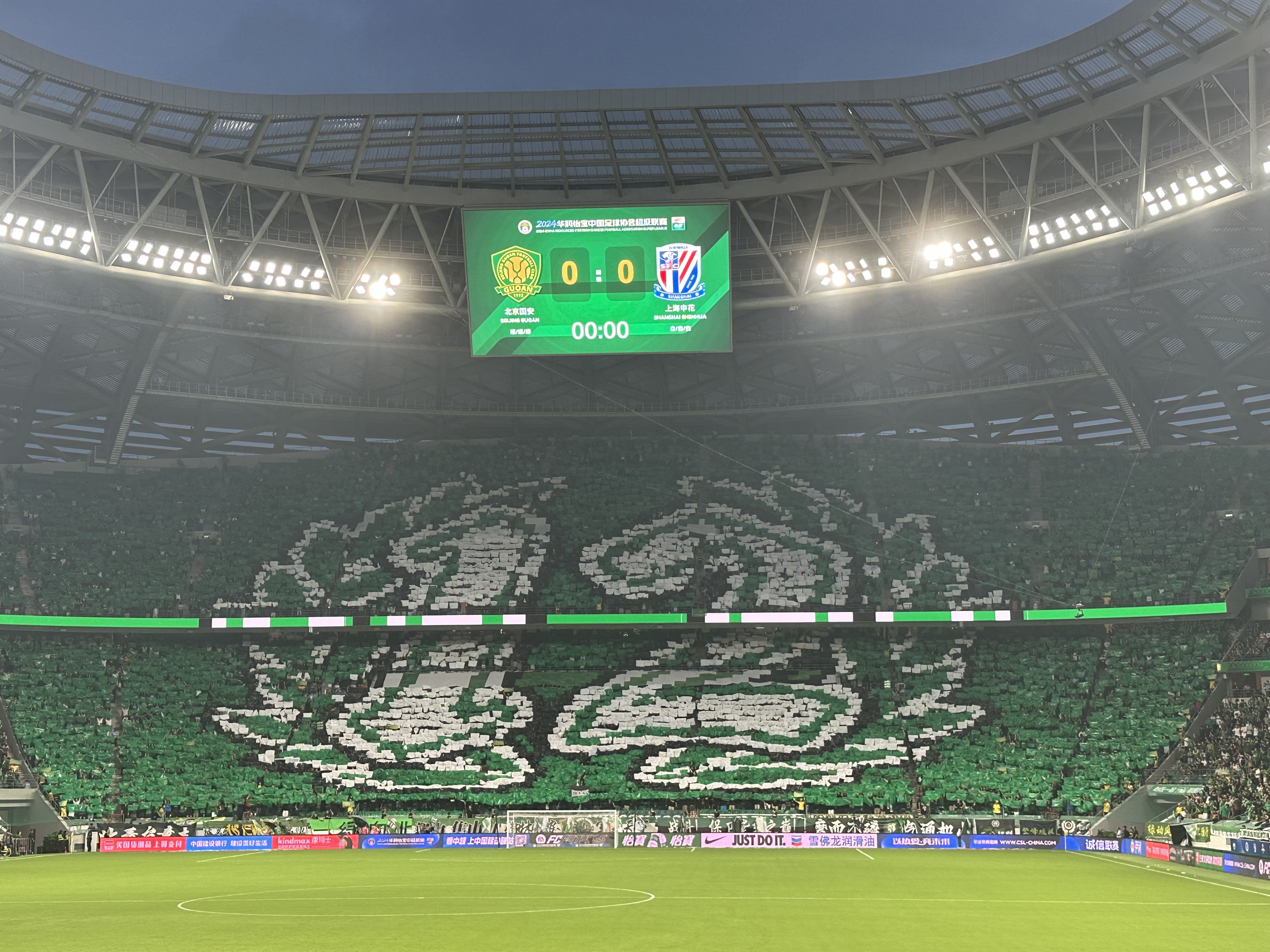
Tifo in the northern stands ahead of a match-up against Shanghai Shenhua.

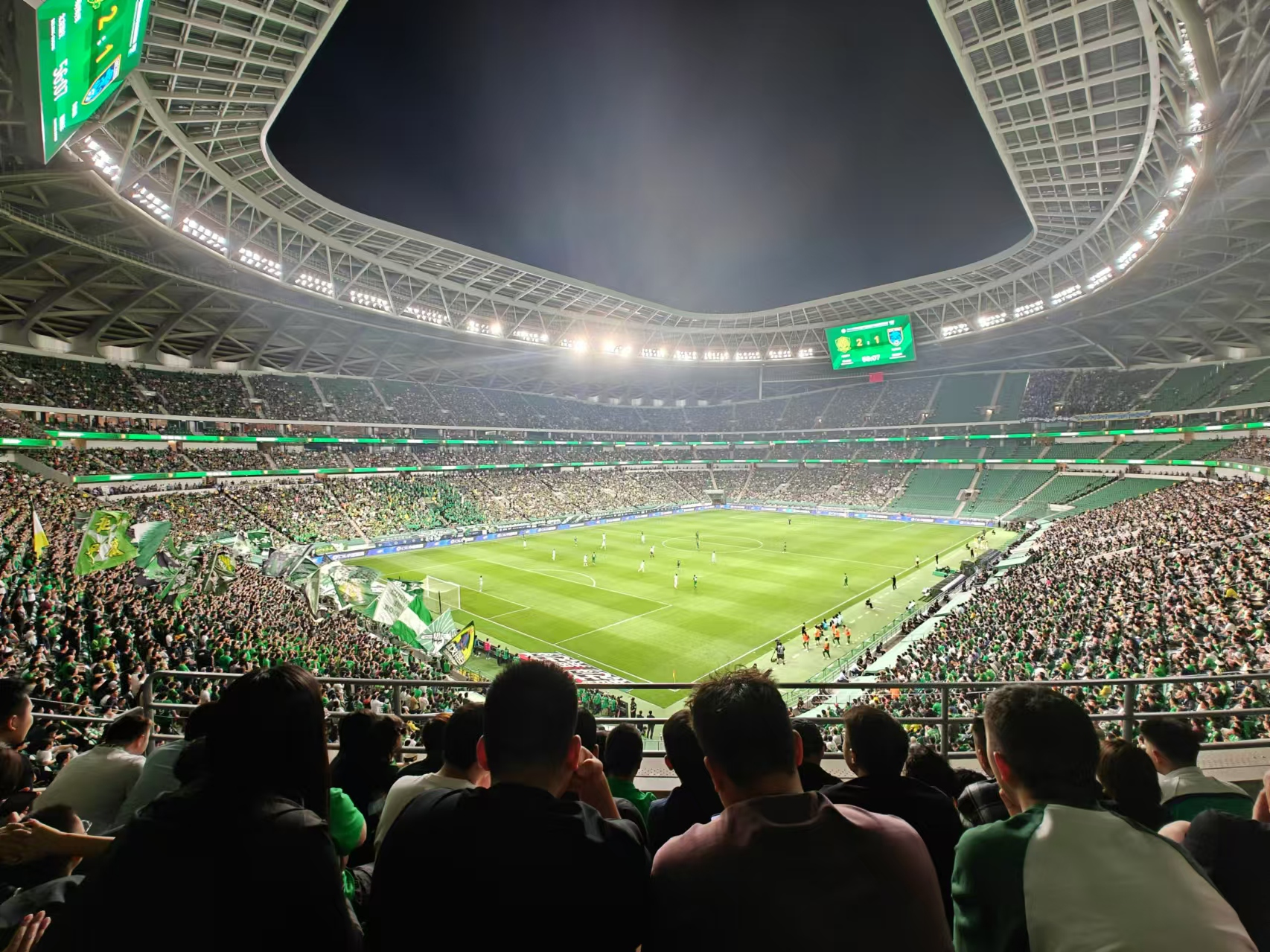
View from the northwestern corner on matchday

Events and tenants
Preceded by Workers' Stadium (1959)	Home of the Beijing Guoan; 2023–present	Succeeded by current
