= Zambia at the Africa Cup of Nations =

Football statistics

Zambia have played in eighteen editions of the Africa Cup of Nations.

== Overall record ==
Year	Round	Position	Pld	W	D	L	GF	GA
(Sudan) 1957 to (Ghana) 1963	Not affiliated to CAF							
(Tunisia) 1965	Did not enter							
(Ethiopia) 1968	Did not enter							
(Sudan) 1970	Did not qualify							
(Cameroon) 1972	Did not qualify							
(Egypt) 1974	Runners-up	2nd	5	3	0	2	9	7
(Ethiopia) 1976	Did not qualify							
(Ghana) 1978	Group stage	5th	3	1	1	1	3	2
(Nigeria) 1980	Did not qualify							
(Libya) 1982	Third place	3rd	5	3	0	2	7	3
(Ivory Coast) 1984	Did not qualify							
(Egypt) 1986	Group stage	7th	3	0	1	2	2	4
(Morocco) 1988	Withdrew							
(Algeria) 1990	Third place	3rd	5	3	1	1	3	2
(Senegal) 1992	Quarter-finals	7th	3	1	0	2	1	2
(Tunisia) 1994	Runners-up	2nd	5	3	1	1	7	2
(South Africa) 1996	Third place	3rd	6	4	1	1	15	6
(Burkina Faso) 1998	Group stage	10th	3	1	1	1	4	6
(Ghana) (Nigeria) 2000	Group stage	13th	3	0	2	1	3	5
(Mali) 2002	Group stage	14th	3	0	1	2	1	3
(Tunisia) 2004	Did not qualify							
(Egypt) 2006	Group stage	11th	3	1	0	2	3	6
(Ghana) 2008	Group stage	9th	3	1	1	1	5	6
(Angola) 2010	Quarter-finals	6th	4	1	1	2	5	5
(Gabon) (Equatorial Guinea) 2012	Champions	1st	6	5	1	0	9	3
(South Africa) 2013	Group stage	12th	3	0	3	0	2	2
(Equatorial Guinea) 2015	Group stage	13th	3	0	2	1	2	3
(Gabon) 2017	Did not qualify							
(Egypt) 2019	Did not qualify							
(Cameroon) 2021	Did not qualify							
(Ivory Coast) 2023	Group stage	20th	3	0	2	1	2	3
(Morocco) 2025	Qualified							
(Kenya) (Tanzania) (Uganda) 2027	To be determined							
Total	1 title	19/35	69	27	19	23	83	70
