= Raila Odinga International Stadium =

Sports stadium in Nairobi, Kenya

Raila Odinga Stadium
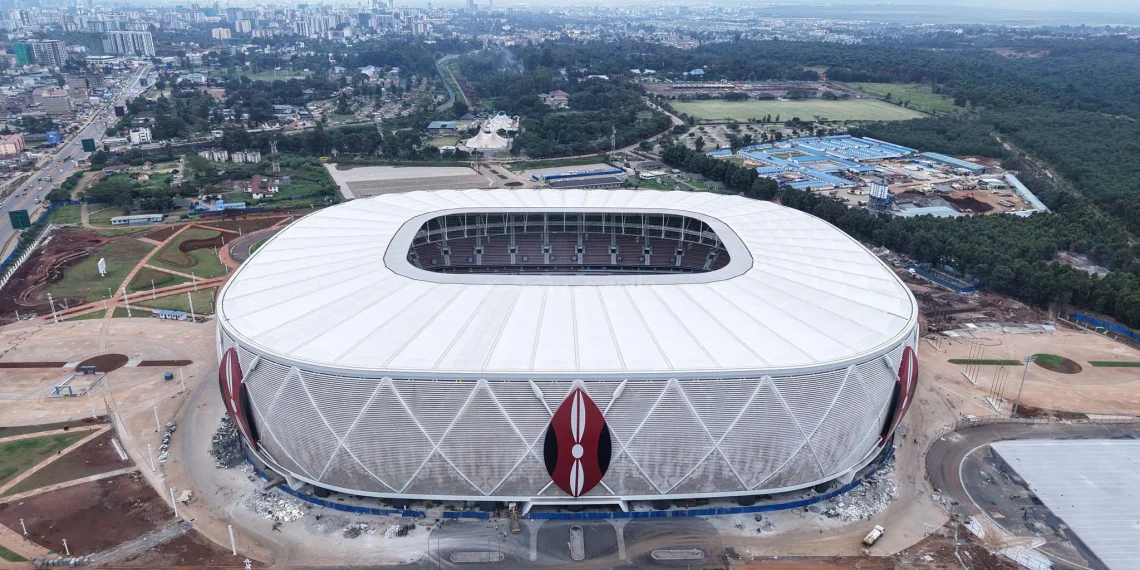
- Birds eye view of the stadium

- Location within Kenya
- Full name: Raila Odinga Stadium; Talanta Sports Stadium
- Former names: Talanta City Stadium (planning/construction phase)
- Location: Nairobi, Kenya
- Coordinates: 01°18′22″S 36°45′01″E
- Owner: Government of Kenya
- Operator: Sports Kenya
- Capacity: 60,000 (Expected)
- Executive suites: 52
- Type: Multi-purpose stadium
- Roof: Canopy
- Surface: GrassMaster
- Scoreboard: Yes
- Field size: 115 yd × 74 yd (105 m × 68 m)
- Public transit: Nairobi Commuter Rail

Construction
- Groundbreaking: 31 March 2024; 2 years ago
- Built: 2024-2026
- Opened: September 2026(Planned)
- Cost: KSh 45.85 billion (approx. US$418.19 million)
- General contractor: China Road and Bridge Corporation

Tenants
- Kenya national football team 2027 Africa Cup of Nations

Raila Odinga International Stadium at Talanta Sports City, Nairobi, is a sports stadium under construction in the only city with a national park, Nairobi, the capital of Kenya. It is intended to be used during the 2027 Africa Cup of Nations football tournament. The stadium is one of the stadia that Kenya plans to use during the tournament, that will be jointly hosted by Tanzania, Uganda and Kenya in the PAMOJA initiative On 12 December 2025, during the 62nd Jamhuri Day celebrations, President William Ruto promised that the government would approve the renaming of Talanta Stadium to Raila Odinga International Stadium as a commemorative gesture.

== Location ==
The stadium is located past Dagoretti Corner in the neighborhood known as "Jamhuri Grounds" or Posta Grounds, along Ngong Road, next to Polo Grounds and Jamhuri ASK Showground approximately 10 kilometres (6 mi) west of the central business district of Nairobi.

== Overview ==
Raila Odinga International Stadium, with a planned capacity of 60,000, is intended for football and rugby matches. There will be no athletics track, although athletics fields will be erected adjacent to the stadium.

The primary purpose of this stadium is to be part of the host stadia that Kenya will use to host the 2027 Africa Cup of Nations in a tri-state-host tournament to be held in the East African countries of Kenya, Tanzania and Uganda. Other Kenyan stadia include the 60,000 seater Moi International Sports Centre in Kasarani and the 35,000 seater Nyayo National Stadium, also in Nairobi.

In September 2023, the Confederation of African Football (CAF), announced the East Africa Pamoja bid by Kenya, Uganda and Tanzania as the winning bid to host the 2027 AFCON tournament. The bid beat out other bids by other countries including Egypt, Senegal, Botswana and Algeria. At the bidding stage the Kenya Football Federation nominated the three Nairobi national stadiums and the 10,000 seater Kipchoge Keino Stadium in Eldoret.

In March 2026, the Confederation of African Football (CAF) released a report stating it was yet to meet the necessary standards (Category 4) for hosting the tournament.

== Structure and facilities ==
The stadium will feature solar panels, rain water harvesting systems: that will provide greywater for reuse in non-potable forms, glass fronted luxury suites providing panaromic views of the football pitch and an asymmetrical shield silhouette resembling the shield on the Flag of Kenya.

== Construction ==
The construction contract was awarded to China Road and Bridge Corporation (CRBC), a subsidiary of China Communications Construction Company (CCCC), a Chinese, majority state-owned, publicly traded multinational engineering and construction conglomerate. The contract price has not been disclosed. The supervising engineer is the KDF Engineering Department. Construction started on 1 March 2024 and is planned to last approximately two years. Later it was revealed that the project was a public private partnership (PPP) arrangement between the government of Kenya and a yet-to-be identified third party.

In July 2024, Linzi Finco 003 Trust, a subsidiary of Liaison Group, listed a KSh 44.79 billion infrastructure asset-backed security on the Nairobi Securities Exchange to fund the construction of the stadium. The bond is backed by future revenues of the project, and has been dubbed "one of the most sophisticated structured financings in East Africa."

In January 2026, the Defense PS Patrick Mariru stated that the bulk of the work was done, bringing the project to its final phase with 80% completion.

By early July, Sports Kenya reported that the planted Bermuda grass had germinated.
