= Benjamin Mkapa Stadium =

Stadium in Temeke District of Dar es Salaam Region, Tanzania

- Uwanja wa Taifa (Swahili)
- Aerial view of the stadium

- Location in east Tanzania.
- Address: Taifa Road
- Location: Miburani, Temeke District, Dar es Salaam, Tanzania
- Coordinates: 6.8536°S 39.2738°E
- Owner: Tanzanian Government
- Operator: Tanzania Football Federation
- Capacity: 60,000
- Type: Multi-purpose stadium
- Surface: GrassMaster
- Scoreboard: Yes
- Record attendance: 70,000 (Young Africans vs Simba, 26 October 2008)
- Field size: 105 × 68 m
- Public transit: Kurasini Station (4 km)

Construction
- Groundbreaking: 2005
- Built: 2005-2007
- Opened: 2007
- Cost: $56 million
- Architect: WMS Architects
- Main contractor: Beijing Construction Engineering Group

Tenants
- Tanzania national football team (2007–present); Simba S.C. (2007–present); Young Africans S.C. (2007–present)

Website
- www.habari.go.tz

Benjamin Mkapa Stadium, also known as Tanzania National Stadium, is a multi-purpose stadium located in Miburani ward of Temeke District in Dar es Salaam, Tanzania. It opened in 2007 and was built adjacent to Uhuru Stadium, the former national stadium. It hosts major football matches such as the Tanzanian Premier League and home matches of the Tanzania national football team. It is intended to be used during the 2027 Africa Cup of Nations soccer tournament.

With 60,000 seats it is amongst the 20 largest stadiums in Africa and the largest stadium in Tanzania. It is owned by the Tanzanian Government. The stadium was built by Beijing Construction Engineering Group at a cost of $56 million.

A capacity crowd attended the first derby between Simba and Young Africans at the stadium in Dar es-Salaam 2008. Both clubs mostly draw low attendances for their other league matches.

== History ==
In 2000, President Benjamin Mkapa promised to build a state of the art stadium before the end of his tenure in 2005; saying that it was shameful for the country not to have a modern arena. In January 2003, the government announced a tender for the construction of a new stadium to replace the dilapidated Uhuru Stadium. Sports Minister Juma Kapuya said that the government had set a budget of $60 million and eleven companies had bid for the project.

In 2004, Vinci Construction, a French company won the tender with a bid of $154 million. Under pressure from the Bretton Woods Institutions, Tanzania reluctantly abandoned the project as it had received debt relief under the Highly Indebted Poor Countries Program. Deborah Brautigam in her book The Dragon's Gift: The Real Story of China in Africa writes, "To the Bretton Woods Institutions, building a modern stadium in a poor country with an annual per capita income of $330 seemed a bit like the Romans building a new Coliseum with the barbarians camped outside the city wall."

In June 2004, Foreign Minister Jakaya Kikwete signed a $56 million contract with the Chinese Government, who provided a grant of about $20 million. A Chinese Embassy official described it as a "special aid project". Beijing Construction Engineering Group was awarded the contract. The International Monetary Fund objected that the cost had not been included in the country's annual Public Expenditure Review to its major donors.

In June 2006, Chinese Premier Wen Jiabao paid a visit to the construction site. The Daily News reported that Tanzania contributed TSh 25 billion of the total cost of TSh 56.4 billion. In September 2007, the stadium hosted the Group 7 qualifying match between Taifa Stars and the Mozambican team for the 2008 Africa Cup of Nations. The stadium also hosted the first EPL team match in the African continent when Everton played Kenya's Gor Mahia on July 13, 2017.

It served as the end point for the 2008 Summer Olympics torch relay in Dar es Salaam. Tanzania was the torch's only stop on the African continent. The stadium was inaugurated by Chinese President Hu Jintao and Tanzanian President Jakaya Kikwete during the former's state visit to Tanzania in February 2009.

Following the 2011 Dar es Salaam explosions at an army base, at least 4,000 people sought shelter at the stadium. China formally handed over the Phase I of the complex in July 2013. The stadium has hosted friendly matches with notable teams across the world such as the Brazil national football team, Everton and Sevilla.

In 2024, the stadium underwent renovation which primarily sought to replace the 60,000 seats.

== Stadium ==
It has five main entrances, a car park for 600 vehicles, 114 closed-circuit television cameras, a VIP lounge and an extendable roof.

The pitch size, as lined for association football, is 105m long by 68 metres wide.

In late July 2020, the stadium was renamed after the late former president Benjamin Mkapa.

== Future expansion ==
Phase Two of the project will entail the construction of an indoor stadium, warm-up ground and a sports village/college.

== Average attendances ==
Tenants	League season	Home games	Average attendance
Simba SC	2023-24	15	7,514
Young Africans	2023-24	15	9,460

== See also ==
- Stadium diplomacy
- List of stadiums in Tanzania
- Arusha Sports Stadium
- Lists of stadiums
