= 2011 Dar es Salaam explosions =

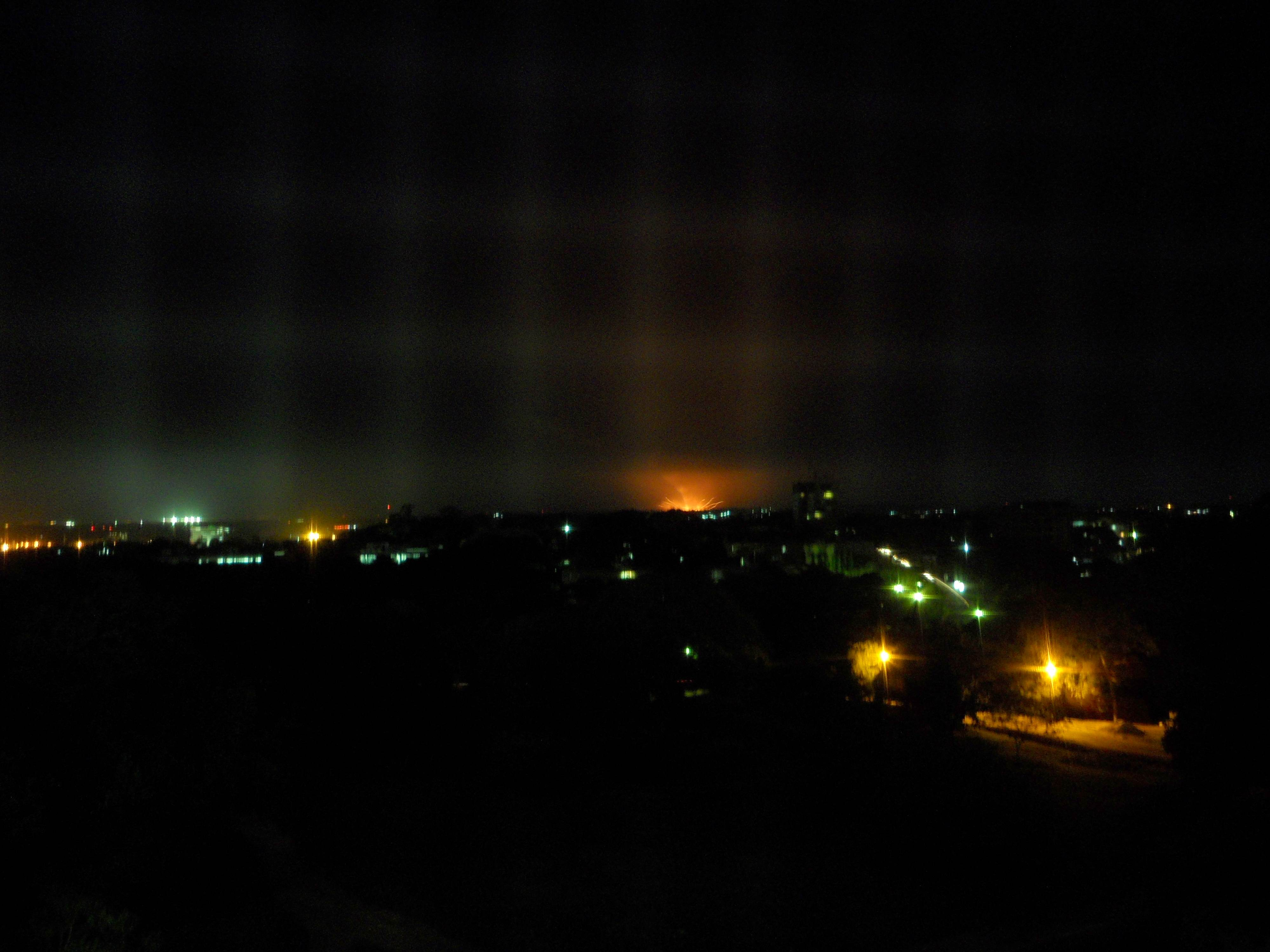
- As seen from the dorms of UDSM in Ubungo District.

- Location within Tanzania
- Date: 16 February 2011
- Time: 8:30 pm EAT (first explosion)
- Location: Gongolamboto, Ilala District, Dar es Salaam, Tanzania; 06°52′35″S 39°08′56″E
- Casualties: 20–32 dead, 300 injured

The 2011 Dar es Salaam explosions were a series of store ammunition explosions at an ammunition depot in Gongolamboto ward of Ilala District of Dar es Salaam, Tanzania, that killed 20–32 people. According to officials at the base, the first explosion was at 8:30 pm local time. Being the second explosion in two years of an ammunition depot near a populated area, several groups questioned the locations of these centers and requested they be moved. Reports indicate that 23 military structures, two homes and a school were destroyed.

The first of several reported explosions was at around 10 pm local time, and eyewitnesses reported that intermittent explosions occurred during the following hour for two minutes at a time. Media reports said that between 20 and 32 people were killed by the blasts and that 300 more were injured as homes were flattened and debris fell from the sky. The deaths were either directly from the explosions or from the effects of high blood pressure. Debris was reported as far as 15 km (9.3 mi) away from the base. At least 200 children were reported to be missing their parents as well; it was unknown whether their parents were missing from the explosions or were separated during the evacuation.

Immediately following the incident, officials in the city ordered all residents within a 10 km (6.2 mi) radius of the military base to evacuate. An estimated 4,000 residents fled their homes. Residents in the city began calling for the resignation of Defence and National Service minister, Hussein Mwinyi, and the chief of defence forces, General Davis Mwamunyange. On February 17, an investigation was launched to find the cause of the explosions.

The country's main airport, the Julius Nyerere International Airport, was also temporarily shut down. A similar incident occurred in April 2009 at the Mbagala ward of the city.
