= Beijing Construction Engineering Group =

Chinese engineering company

Beijing Construction Engineering Group Co., Ltd. 北京建工集团
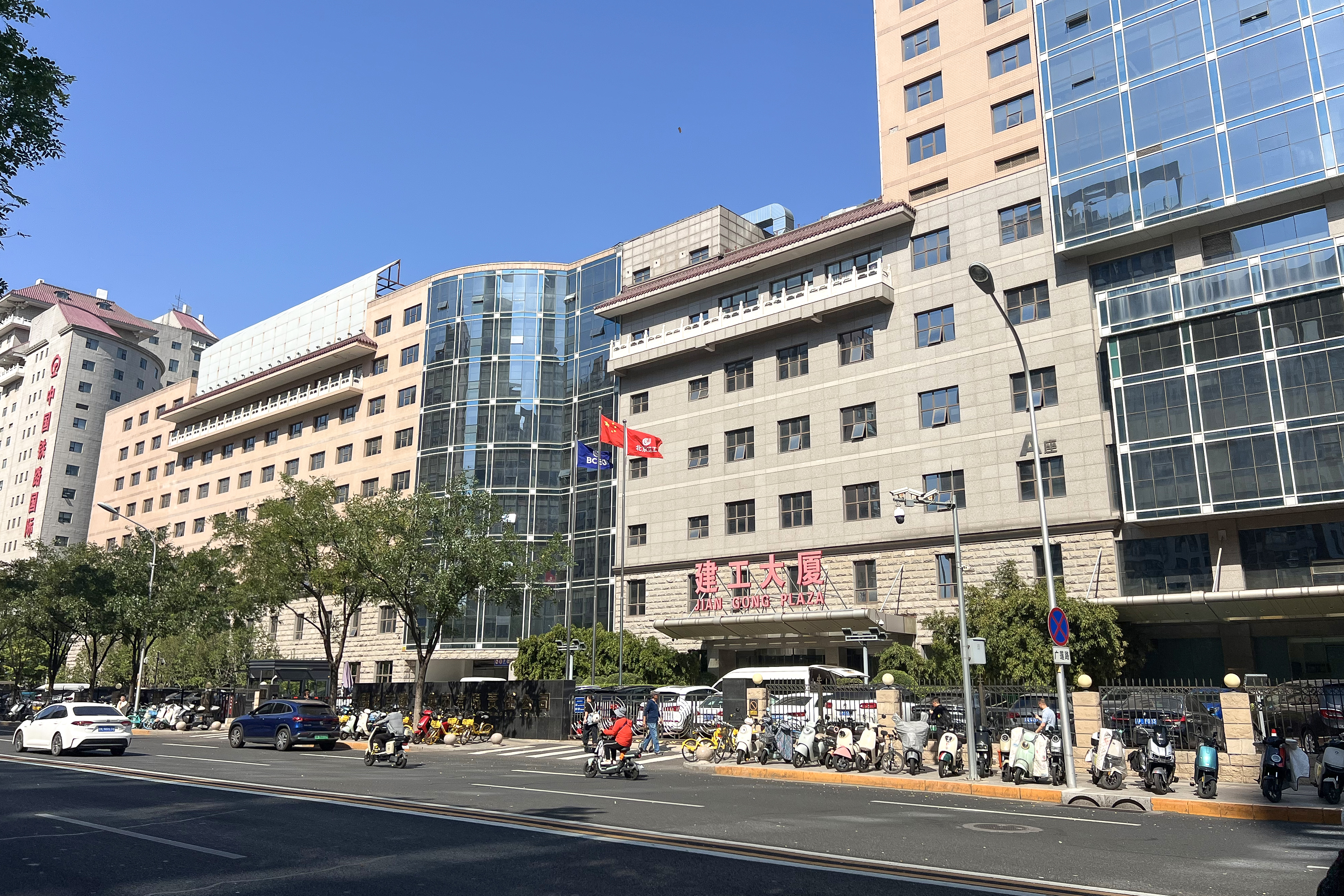
- Headquarters
- Industry: Construction and engineering
- Founded: 1953
- Headquarters: Beijing, China
- Website: www.bcegc.com

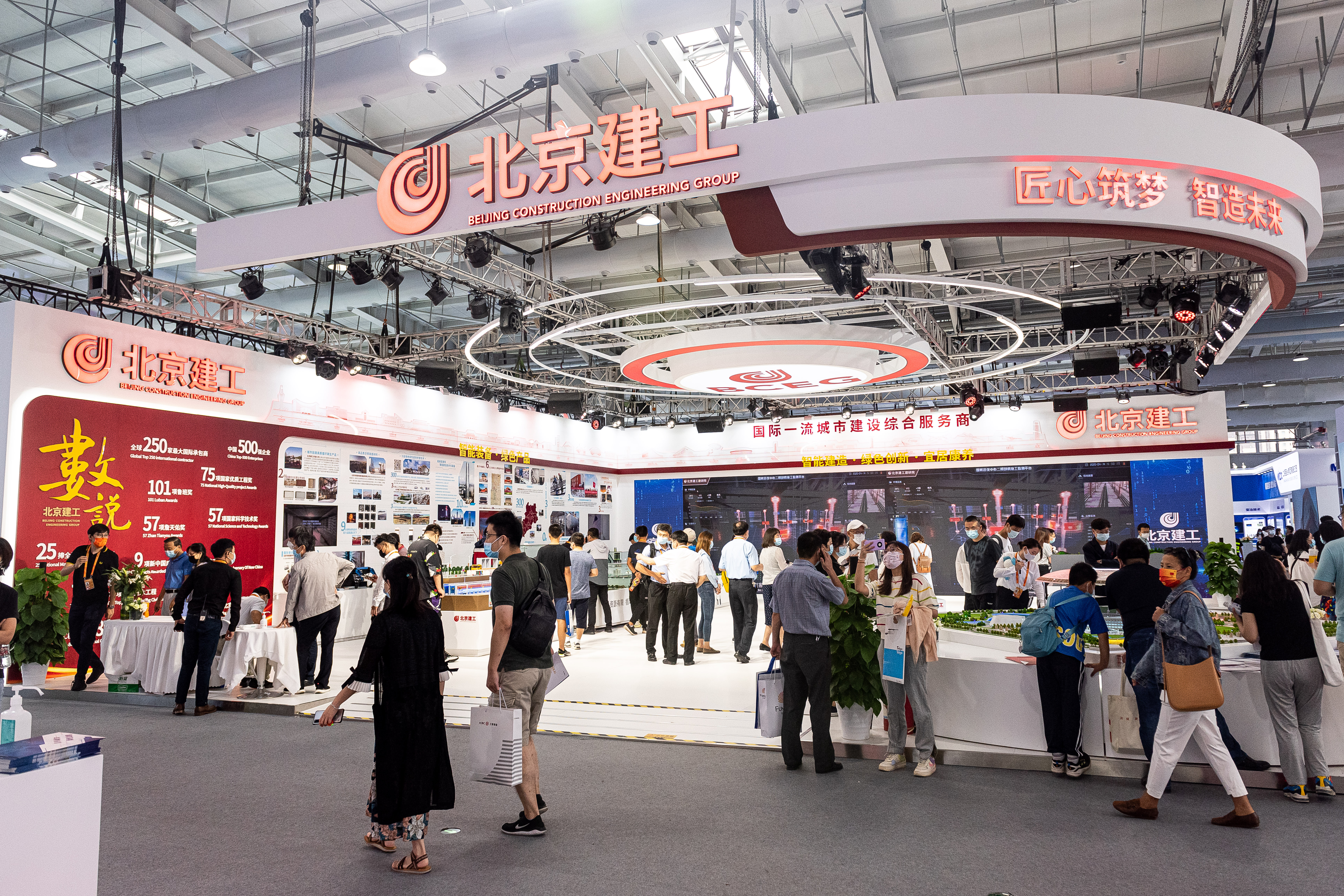
Beijing Construction Engineering Group at China International Fair for Trade in Services 2021

Beijing Construction Engineering Group (BCEG) is a Chinese construction and engineering firm that has built important structures in Beijing and infrastructures and buildings overseas through international branches, in particular, an active subsidiary in the United States, BCEGI-USA. Ranked in 2012, with revenue of US$5.5 billion, it is the 50th largest construction and engineering company in the world by revenue.

International branches include operations in Congo, Equatorial Guinea, Russia, Kazakhstan, Malaysia, Mauritius, Mongolia, Philippines, Rwanda, Singapore, Tanzania, Togo, United Arab Emirates, United States, and Vietnam. A high-profile project taken on by the US subsidiary BCEGI-USA is a $1.2 billion, 94-acre wholesale merchandise mart in Osceola County in Central Florida. The project was approved in 2012 and is expected to begin construction in 2014. When completed it will include a 500-room hotel, 1.5 million square feet of wholesale space, and 728 homes. An excited county commissioner referred to it as a "magnet for jobs".

In October 2013, it was announced Beijing Construction Engineering Group will be part of a group investing £800m in Manchester Airport in England to develop its surrounding business. The news was announced by the UK Chancellor of the Exchequer, George Osborne, on a trip to China to promote UK business and encourage Chinese investors to consider the UK.

== Major projects ==
- Workers' Stadium renovation project, Beijing, China
- National Stadium, Tanzania
