= Shanxi Construction Engineering Group Corporation =

Chinese construction engineering contractor

- Company type: State owned enterprise
- Industry: Construction engineering
- Headquarters: Taiyuan, Shanxi
- Revenue: US$ 5.49 billion (contracting revenue) (2014)

Shanxi Construction Engineering Group Corporation is a Chinese construction engineering contractor.

In 2025, the parent company Shanxi Construction Investment Group Co. Ltd. was ranked the 13th largest construction company in the world.

== Projects ==
The company mainly works in China but completes a number of Chinese development projects abroad.

- Sri Lanka Bandaranaike Memorial International Conference Hall in Colombo, Sri Lanka
- Sri Lanka Kiribathgoda to Kadawatha of Colombo to Kandy road
- Jamaica Sligoville mini-stadium - Miniature stadium and sports complex was a gift from the government of China
